BWV Anh., abbreviation of  (German for Bach works catalogue annex), is a list of lost, doubtful, and spurious compositions by, or once attributed to, Johann Sebastian Bach.

History

First edition of the Bach-Werke-Verzeichnis (1950)
In 1950 the Bach-Werke-Verzeichnis was published, allocating a unique number to every known composition by Bach. Wolfgang Schmieder, the editor of that catalogue, grouped the compositions by genre, largely following the 19th-century  (BG) edition for the collation (e.g. BG cantata number = BWV number of the cantata):
 Kantaten (Cantatas), BWV 1–224
 Motetten (Motets), BWV 225–231
 Messen, Messensätze, Magnificat (Masses, Mass movements, Magnificat), BWV 232–243
 Passionen, Oratorien (Passions, Oratorios), BWV 244–249
 Vierstimmige Choräle (Four-part chorales), BWV 250–438
 Lieder, Arien, Quodlibet (Songs, Arias and Quodlibet), BWV 439–524
 Werke für Orgel (Works for organ), BWV 525–771
 Werke für Klavier (Keyboard compositions), BWV 772–994
 Werke für Laute (Lute compositions), BWV 995–1000
 Kammermusik (Chamber music), BWV 1001–1040
 Orchesterwerke (Works for orchestra), BWV 1041–1071, originally in two separate chapters: Concertos (BWV 1041–1065) and Overtures (BWV 1066–1071)
 Kanons (Canons), BWV 1072–1078
 Musikalisches Opfer, Kunst der Fuge (Musical Offering, Art of the Fugue), BWV 1079–1080

The  of the BWV listed works that were not suitable for the main catalogue, in three sections:
 I – lost works, or works of which only a tiny fraction had survived (BWV Anh. 1–23)
 II – works of dubious authenticity (BWV Anh. 24–155)
 III – works that were once attributed to Bach, but for which it had been established they were not composed by him (BWV Anh. 156–189)

Within each section of the  the works are sorted by genre, following the same sequence of genres as the main catalogue.

Second edition of the Bach-Werke-Verzeichnis (1990 and 1998)
A strict numerical collation was abandoned to insert additions, or when for another reason compositions were regrouped. Authenticity discriminations, based on new research, could lead to such repositionings within the catalogue, e.g. "" became "" indicating it was now considered a spurious work.

In 1998 Alfred Dürr and Yoshitake Kobayashi published a small edition of the catalogue, based on the 1990 second edition. This edition, known as BWV2a, contained a few further updates and collation rearrangements.

New additions (Nachträge) to BWV2/BWV2a included:
 BWV 1081–1126
 BWV Anh. 190–213

A few exceptions to the principle that compositions weren't renumbered were when a composition from the  could be recovered and/or authenticated as Bach's, so that it deserved a place in the main catalogue, in which case it was given a number above 1080. So, for example, BWV Anh. 205 (BWV2) → BWV 1121 (BWV2a, where it is in section 7 as a work for organ).

Other renumberings and additional numbers involved alternative or earlier versions of basically the same composition, which were indicated by adding a lower case letter to the BWV number. For example,  was renumbered to BWV 149/1a (earlier abandoned version of the opening movement of Cantata BWV 149)

Slashes indicate movements: e.g. BWV 149/1 indicates the first movement of the Cantata BWV 149. Another example: the Agnus Dei of the Mass in B minor can be indicated as BWV 232/22 (22nd movement of the composition), or alternatively as BWV 232IV/4 (BWV 232, fourth movement of Part IV).

Bachs Notenbibliothek (1992)
 published Bachs Notenbibliothek (BNB) in 1992. As a compendium of works in Bach's musical library, it listed as well Bach's own compositions, as works by other composers of which Bach owned a copy. Several compositions of this latter group are listed in the BWV Anh. (mostly Anh. III). For example, the Kyrie–Gloria Mass for double choir, BWV Anh. 167, is listed as BNB I/An/3 in Beißwenger's catalogue.

21st century
As of mid-2018 the Bach Digital website started to implement the new numbers of the next edition of the Bach-Werke-Verzeichnis. The editors of this third edition of the Bach-Werke-Verzeichnis (projected to be published in 2020) recognise that the BWV Anh. has become largely unworkable, calling for a new approach.

List

Legend

Table
|- id="BWV Anhang" style="background: #D8D8D8;"
| data-sort-value="A000.001" | Anh. I
| data-sort-value="449.020" colspan="8" | Fragments – lost works
| data-sort-value="1307a" | Up ↑
|- id="BWV Anh. 1"
| data-sort-value="A001.000" | I 1 
| data-sort-value="449.051" | I
| data-sort-value="1725-07-15" | 1725-07-15?
| Cantata Gesegnet ist die Zuversicht (Trinity VII)
| 
| SATB 2Fl Str Bc
| 
| 
| data-sort-value="by Telemann (TWV 1:0617)" | by Telemann (TWV 1:617)?; text by Neumeister?
| 
|- id="BWV Anh. 2"
| data-sort-value="A002.000" | I 2  
| data-sort-value="449.052" | I
| data-sort-value="1729-10-23" | 

| data-sort-value="Cantata (sketch: Gott, du Richter der Gedanken for Trinity XIX?)" |

| 

| data-sort-value="SATB Vl Str Bc" | 

| 

| data-sort-value="III/01" | 

| see BWV 1137
| 
|-
| data-sort-value="A003.000" | I 3  
| data-sort-value="449.053" | I
| data-sort-value="1730-08-25" | 

| data-sort-value="Cantata Gott, gib dein Gerichte dem Könige (council election)" | 

| 

| 

| 

| data-sort-value="I/32.2" | 

| see BWV 1140
| 
|- id="BWV Anh. 4"
| data-sort-value="A004.000" | I 4
| data-sort-value="450.001" | I
| data-sort-value="1725-08-27" | 

| data-sort-value="Cantata Wünschet Jerusalem Glück (council election)" | 

| 

| 

| 

| 

| see BWV 1139.1
| 
|- id="BWV Anh. 4a"
| data-sort-value="A004.a00" | I 4a
| data-sort-value="450.002" | I
| data-sort-value="1730-06-27" | 

| data-sort-value="Cantata Wünschet Jerusalem Glück (200th anniversary of the Augsburg Confession)" | 

| 

| 

| 

| 

| see BWV 1139.2
| 
|-
| data-sort-value="A005.000" | I 5
| data-sort-value="450.003" | I
| data-sort-value="1718-12-10" | 

| data-sort-value="Cantata Lobet den Herrn, alle seine Heerscharen (birthday of Leopold of Anhalt-Köthen)" | 

| 

| 

| 

| data-sort-value="I/34" | 

| see BWV 1147
| 
|- id="BWV Anh. 6"
| data-sort-value="A006.000" | I 6
| data-sort-value="450.004" | I
| data-sort-value="1720-01-01" | 

| data-sort-value="Secular cantata Dich loben die lieblichen Strahlen der Sonne (New Year)" | 

| 

| 

| 

| data-sort-value="I/35" | 

| see BWV 1151
| 
|- id="BWV Anh. 7"
| data-sort-value="A007.000" | I 7  
| data-sort-value="450.005" | I
| data-sort-value="1720-12-10" | 

| data-sort-value="Secular cantata Heut ist gewiß ein guter Tag (birthday of Leopold of Anhalt-Köthen)" | 

| 

| 

| 

| data-sort-value="I/35" | 

| see BWV 1153
| 
|- id="BWV Anh. 8"
| data-sort-value="A008.000" | I 8
| data-sort-value="451.001" | I
| data-sort-value="1723-01-01" | 

| data-sort-value="Secular cantata for New Year (congratulation of Leopold of Anhalt-Köthen and his wife Frederica Henriette)" | 

| 

| 

| 

| data-sort-value="I/35" | 

| see BWV 1152
| 
|-
| data-sort-value="A009.000" | I 9 
| data-sort-value="451.002" | I
| data-sort-value="1727-05-12" | 

| data-sort-value="Secular cantata Entfernet euch, ihr heitern Sterne (57th birthday of Augustus II)" | 

| 

| 

| 

| data-sort-value="I/36" | 

| see BWV 1156
| 
|- id="BWV Anh. 10"
| data-sort-value="A010.000" | I 10
| data-sort-value="451.003" | I
| data-sort-value="1731-08-25" | 

| data-sort-value="Secular cantata So kampfet nur, ihr muntern Tone (birthday of Joachim Friedrich von Flemming)" | 

| 

| 

| 

| data-sort-value="I/39" | 

| see BWV 1160
| 
|-
| data-sort-value="A011.000" | I 11
| data-sort-value="451.004" | I
| data-sort-value="1732-08-03" | 

| data-sort-value="Secular cantata Es lebe der König, der Vater im Lande (name day of Augustus II)" | 

| 

| 

| 

| data-sort-value="I/36" | 

| see BWV 1157
| 
|- id="BWV Anh. 12"
| data-sort-value="A012.000" | I 12
| data-sort-value="451.005" | I
| data-sort-value="1733-08-03" | 

| data-sort-value="Secular cantata Frohes Volk, vergnügte Sachsen (name day of Augustus III)" | 

| 

| 

| 

| data-sort-value="I/36" | 

| see BWV 1158
| 
|- id="BWV Anh. 13"
| data-sort-value="A013.000" | I 13
| data-sort-value="452.001" | I
| data-sort-value="1738-04-28" | 

| data-sort-value="Secular cantata Willkommen! Ihr herrschenden Götter der Erden" | 

| 

| 

| 

| data-sort-value="I/37" | 

| see BWV 1161
| 
|- id="BWV Anh. 14"
| data-sort-value="A014.000" | I 14 
| data-sort-value="452.002" | I
| data-sort-value="1725-02-12" | 

| data-sort-value="Cantata Sein Segen fließt daher wie ein Strom (wedding)" | 

| 

| 

| 

| 

| see BWV 1144
| 
|- id="BWV Anh. 15"
| data-sort-value="A015.000" | I 15 
| data-sort-value="452.003" | I
| data-sort-value="1724-04-27" | 

| data-sort-value="Cantata Siehe, der Hüter Israel (doctorate)" | 

| 

| data-sort-value="SATB 3Tr Tmp 2Ob 3Vl Va Bc" | 

| 

| data-sort-value="I/34" | 

| see BWV 1148
| 
|- id="BWV Anh. 16"
| data-sort-value="A016.000" | I 16  
| data-sort-value="452.004" | I
| 1735-11-09
| Cantata Schließt die Gruft! ihr Trauerglocken (mourning of Hedwig of Merseburg)
| 
| 
| 
| 
| by Roemhildt; text by Hoffmann, B.
| 
|- id="BWV Anh. 17"
| data-sort-value="A017.000" | I 17
| data-sort-value="453.001" | I
| 
| Cantata Mein Gott, nimm die gerechte Seele (funeral)
| 
| SATB 2Oba Str Bas Bc
| 
| I/33
| 
| 
|-
| data-sort-value="A018.000" | I 18
| data-sort-value="453.002" | I
| data-sort-value="1732-06-05" | 

| data-sort-value="Secular cantata Froher Tag, verlangte Stunden (inauguration of St. Thomas school after renovation)" | 

| 

| 

| 

| data-sort-value="I/39" | 

| see BWV 1162
| 
|- id="BWV Anh. 19"
| data-sort-value="A019.000" | I 19
| data-sort-value="453.003" | I
| 1734-11-21
| Secular cantata Thomana saß annoch betrübt (welcome to Johann August Ernesti as new rector of St. Thomas school)
| 
| 
| 
| I/39
| text by ?
| 
|- id="BWV Anh. 20"
| data-sort-value="A020.000" | I 20
| data-sort-value="453.004" | I
| data-sort-value="1723-08-09" | 

| data-sort-value="Ode in Latin (birthday of Frederick II of Saxe-Gotha)" | 

| 

| 

| 

| data-sort-value="I/38" | 

| see BWV 1155
| 
|- id="BWV Anh. 190" style="background: #F5F6CE;"
| data-sort-value="A190.000" | N 190
| data-sort-value="454.003" | I
| 1729-04-18
| Cantata Ich bin ein Pilgrim auf der Welt (Easter 2)
| 
| b Bc ...
| 
| I/33
| by Bach, C. P. E.?; text by Picander
| 
|- id="BWV Anh. 191"
| data-sort-value="A191.000" | N 191
| data-sort-value="454.004" | I
| 1715-05-19
| Cantata Leb ich oder leb ich nicht (Cantate)
| 
| 
| 
| 
| text by Franck, S.
| 
|-
| data-sort-value="A192.000" | N 192 
| data-sort-value="454.005" | I
| data-sort-value="1709-02-04 | 

| data-sort-value="Cantata for Ratswahl in Mühlhausen No. 2 | 

| 

| 

| 

| 

| see BWV 1138.1
| 
|- id="BWV Anh. 193"
| data-sort-value="A193.000" | N 193
| data-sort-value="454.006" | I
| data-sort-value="1740-08-29" | 

| data-sort-value="Cantata Herrscher des Himmels, König der Ehren (council election)" | 

| 

| 

| 

| data-sort-value="I/32.2" | 

| see BWV 1141
| 
|- id="BWV Anh. 194"
| data-sort-value="A194.000" | N 194	
| data-sort-value="455.001" | I
| data-sort-value="1722-07-29" | 

| data-sort-value="Cantata O vergnügte Stunden (birthday of John Augustus of Anhalt-Zerbst)" | 

| 

| 

| 

| 

| see BWV 1154
| 
|- id="BWV Anh. 195"
| data-sort-value="A195.000" | N 195	
| data-sort-value="455.002" | I
| 1723-06-09
| Secular cantata Murmelt nur, ihr heitern Bäche (celebration of )
| 
| 
| 
| 
| text in 
| 
|- id="BWV Anh. 196"
| data-sort-value="A196.000" | N 196	
| data-sort-value="455.003" | I
| data-sort-value="1725-11-27" | 

| data-sort-value="Secular cantata Auf, süß entzückende Gewalt (wedding of Peter, eldest son of Peter Hohmann, and Christiana Sibylla Mencke)" | 

| 

| 

| 

| data-sort-value="I/40" | 

| see BWV 1163
| 
|- id="BWV Anh. 197"
| data-sort-value="A197.000" | N 197
| data-sort-value="455.004" | I
| data-sort-value="1721-07-01" | 

| data-sort-value="Cantata Ihr wallenden Wolken (New Year)" | 

| 

| data-sort-value="b Flx2 Str Vc Hc Bc" | 

| 

| data-sort-value="I/04" | 

| see BWV 1150
| 
|-
| data-sort-value="A198.000" | N 198
| data-sort-value="455.005" | I
| data-sort-value="1729-09-28" | 

| data-sort-value="Cantata Man..." | 

| 

| data-sort-value="SATB 3Tr Tmp 2Ob Str Bc" | 

| 

| data-sort-value="I/40" |

| see BWV 149/1a
| 
|- id="BWV Anh. 199"
| data-sort-value="A199.000" | N 199
| data-sort-value="455.006" | I
| data-sort-value="1724-03-25" | 

| data-sort-value="Cantata Siehe, eine Jungfrau ist schwanger (25 March: Annunciation)" | 

| 

| 

| 

| 

| see BWV 1135
| 
|- style="background: #E3F6CE;"
| data-sort-value="A200.000" | N 200 	
| data-sort-value="456.002" | I
| data-sort-value="1714-07-01" | 1713–1715
| chorale setting "O Traurigkeit, o Herzeleid" (unused sketch for Orgelbüchlein)
| 
| Organ
| 
| data-sort-value="IV/01: 046" | IV/1: 46
| after Z 1915; in SBB P 283
| 
|- id="BWV Anh. 209"
| data-sort-value="A209.000" | N 209 	
| data-sort-value="456.003" | I
| data-sort-value="1712-12-31" | 

| data-sort-value="Cantata Liebster Gott, vergißt du mich (1711: libretto for Trin. VII; 1725: Trin. XV?; 1727: funeral in Pomßen)" | 

| 

| 

| 

| 

| see BWV 1136
| 
|- id="BWV Anh. 210"
| data-sort-value="A210.000" | N 210  	
| data-sort-value="456.004" | I
| 1734-10-04
|  (leave-taking of Johann Matthias Gesner)
| 
| 
| 
| 
| text in 2° Poet. Germ. I, 6425: 4 Rara; /1 → BWV 193a/7, 193/3?
| 
|- id="BWV Anh. 211"
| data-sort-value="A211.000" | N 211    	
| data-sort-value="456.005" | I
| data-sort-value="1729-01-18" | 

| data-sort-value="Cantata Der Herr ist freundlich dem, der auf ihn harret (wedding)" | 

| 

| 

| 

| 

| see BWV 1145
| 
|- id="BWV Anh. 212"
| data-sort-value="A212.000" | N 212 	
| data-sort-value="457.001" | I
| data-sort-value="1729-07-26" | 

| data-sort-value="Cantata Vergnügende Flammen, verdoppelt die Macht (wedding)" | 

| 

| 

| 

| 

| see BWV 1146
| 
|-
| data-sort-value="A213.000" | N 213
| data-sort-value="457.002" | I
| 
| Concerto
| F maj.
| Org
| 
| 
| by Telemann; arr. by Bach
| 
|-
| data-sort-value="0223.000" | 223
| data-sort-value="457.003" | I
| data-sort-value="1717-07-01" | 1717–1718?
| Cantata Meine Seele soll Gott loben
| B♭ maj.
| 
| 
| I/34
| by Handel?
| 
|-
| data-sort-value="0224.000" | 224 
| data-sort-value="457.004" | I
| data-sort-value="1732-07-01" | 1732
| Aria "Reißt euch los, bekränkte Sinnen" (fragment)
| 
| S
| 
| I/41
| by Bach, C. P. E.?; in SBB P 491
| 
|- id="BWV Anhang II" style="background: #D8D8D8;"
| data-sort-value="A023.999" | Anh. II
| data-sort-value="459.000" colspan="8" | Works of doubtful authenticity
| data-sort-value="1331a" | Up ↑
|-
| data-sort-value="0053.000" | 53	
| data-sort-value="459.001" | II
| 
| Aria "Schlage doch, gewünschte Stunde" (Funeral)
| E maj.
| a Bel Str Bc
| data-sort-value="000.12 2: 053" | 122: 53
| I/41
| by Hoffmann, M.?
| 
|-
| data-sort-value="0142.000" | 142		
| data-sort-value="459.002" | II
| 
| Cantata Uns ist ein Kind geboren (Christmas)
| A min.
| data-sort-value="atbSATB Flx2 Obx2 Str Bc" | atbSATB 2Fl 2Ob Str Bc
| data-sort-value="000.30: 019" | 30: 19
| I/41
| text by Neumeister (reworked)
| 
|-
| data-sort-value="0189.000" | 189			
| data-sort-value="459.003" | II
| 
| Cantata Meine Seele rühmt und preist (German Magnificat, Visitation)
| B♭ maj.
| t Fl Ob Vl Bc
| data-sort-value="000.37: 213" | 37: 213
| I/41
| by Hoffmann, M.
| 
|-
| data-sort-value="0217.000" | 217
| data-sort-value="459.004" | II
| 
| Cantata Gedenke, Herr, wie es uns gehet (Epiphany I)
| 
| satbSATB Fl Str Bc
| data-sort-value="000.41: 207" | 41: 207
| I/41
| by Altnickol?
| 
|-
| data-sort-value="0220.000" | 220
| data-sort-value="459.005" | II
| 
| Cantata Lobt ihn mit Herz und Munde (24 June: feast of John the Baptist)
| 
| atbSATB Fl 2Ob Str Bc
| data-sort-value="000.41: 259" | 41: 259
| I/41
| 
| 
|-
| data-sort-value="0221.000" | 221
| data-sort-value="459.006" | II
| 
| Cantata Wer sucht die Pracht, wer wünscht den Glanz
| 
| tb 2Vl Bas Vc Org
| 
| I/41
| data-sort-value="in SBB P 0191" | in SBB P 191: 83–113
| 
|-
| data-sort-value="A159.000" | III 159
| data-sort-value="459.007" | II
| data-sort-value="1712-07-01" | 

| 

| 

| data-sort-value="SATBx2" | 

| data-sort-value="000.39: 157" | 

| data-sort-value="III/03" | 

| see BWV 1164
| 
|- style="background: #E3F6CE;"
| data-sort-value="A025.000" | II 25
| data-sort-value="459.008" | II
| data-sort-value="1741-07-01" | 1740–1742(JSB)
| Kyrie–Gloria Mass
| C maj.
| SATB 2Tr 2Vl Org
| data-sort-value="000.11 1: XVI" | 111: XVI
| II/9
| by Bach, J. L.?
| 
|- style="background: #E3F6CE;" 
| data-sort-value="0239.000" | 239
| data-sort-value="460.002" | II
| data-sort-value="1739-12-31" | 1738–1741(JSB)
| Sanctus
| D min.
| SATB Str Bc
| data-sort-value="000.11 1: 089" | 111: 89
| data-sort-value="II/09" |II/9
| after Caldara, Missa Providentiae/4
| 
|-
| data-sort-value="A028.000" | II 28
| data-sort-value="460.004" | II
| 
| Sanctus
| B♭ maj.
| SATB 2Ob 2Cor Str Bc
| data-sort-value="000.11 1: XVII" | 111: XVII
| II/9
| 
| 
|- style="background: #E3F6CE;"
| data-sort-value="A029.000" | II 29
| data-sort-value="460.005" | II
| data-sort-value="1716-01-01" | 1714–17
| Kyrie–Gloria Mass (only cello part extant)
| C min.
| 
| 
| II/9
| in BKraków St 547
| 
|- style="background: #E3F6CE;"
| data-sort-value="A167.000" | III 167
| data-sort-value="460.006" | II
| data-sort-value="1739-01-01" | 1738–1739 (JSB)
| Kyrie–Gloria Mass for two choirs
| G maj.
| data-sort-value="SATBx3 Obx3 Tai Vlx2 Vax2 Vnex2 Bc Org" | 3SATB 3Ob Tai 2Vl 2Va 2Vne Bc Org
| 
| II/9
| by Bernhard, Krieger or Pohle?; in SBB P 659
| 
|- style="background: #E3F6CE;"
| data-sort-value="A030.000" | II 30
| data-sort-value="460.007" | II
| data-sort-value="1742-07-01" | 1690s (Tor.)1742 (JSB)
| Magnificat for double choir
| C maj.
| data-sort-value="SATBx2 Trx3 Tmp 2Vl 2Vla Bc" | 2SATB 3Tr Tmp 2Vl 2Vla Bc
| data-sort-value="000.11 1: XV" | 111: XV
| II/9
| after Torri, Magnificat; Tr3, Tmp by Bach
| 
|- style="background: #E3F6CE;"
| data-sort-value="0246.000" | 246
| data-sort-value="460.008" | II
| 1730-04-07 (JSB)
| Passion St Luke Passion
| 
| data-sort-value="ssatbSATB Flx2 Obx2 Tai Bas Str Bc" | ssatbSATB 2Fl 2Ob Tai Bas Str Bc
| data-sort-value="000.45 2: 000" | 452
| data-sort-value="II/09: 065" | II/9: 65
| data-sort-value="→ BWB 246/40a" | → BWV 246/40a; in SBB P 1017
| 
|- id="BWV Anh. 31"
| data-sort-value="A031.000" | II 31
| data-sort-value="460.009" | II
| 
| chorale setting "Herr Gott, dich loben alle wir"
| 
| SATB 2Tr 3Ob Str Bc
| 
| 
| data-sort-value="in SBB P 0101" | in SBB P 101
| 
|- id="BWV Anh. 201"
| data-sort-value="A201.000" | N 201
| data-sort-value="460.010" | II
| 
| chorale setting "Du Friedefürst, Herr Jesu Christ"
| 
| SATB 
| 
| 
| by Vetter, D.
| 
|- id="BWV Anh. 202"
| data-sort-value="A202.000" | N 202
| data-sort-value="460.011" | II
| 
| chorale setting "Gott hat das Evangelium"
| 
| SATB 
| 
| 
| by Vetter, D.
| 
|- id="BWV Anh. 203"
| data-sort-value="A203.000" | N 203
| data-sort-value="460.012" | II
| 
| chorale setting "Ich hebe meine Augen auf"
| 
| SATB 
| 
| 
| by Vetter, D.
| 
|- id="BWV Anh. 204"
| data-sort-value="A204.000" | N 204 
| data-sort-value="460.013" | II
| 
| chorale setting "O Traurigkeit, o Herzeleid"
| 
| SATB 
| 
| 
| by Vetter, D.
| 
|-
| data-sort-value="A032.000" | II 32
| data-sort-value="460.014" | II
| data-sort-value="1704-07-01" | 1704
| data-sort-value="Geistliche Oden, Sieben und ein Gedicht No. 1" |  No. 1 "Getrost mein Geist, wenn Wind und Wetter krachen"
| 
| Voice Bc 
| 
| 
| in Deutsche Übersetzungen und Gedichte
| 
|-
| data-sort-value="A033.000" | II 33
| data-sort-value="460.015" | II
| data-sort-value="1704-07-01" | 1704
| data-sort-value="Geistliche Oden, Sieben und ein Gedicht No. 2" |  No. 2 "Mein Jesus, spare nicht"
| 
| Voice Bc 
| 
| 
| in Deutsche Übersetzungen und Gedichte
| 
|-
| data-sort-value="A034.000" | II 34 
| data-sort-value="460.016" | II
| data-sort-value="1704-07-01" | 1704
| data-sort-value="Geistliche Oden, Sieben und ein Gedicht No. 3" |  No. 3 "Kann ich mit einem Tone"
| 
| Voice Bc 
| 
| 
| in Deutsche Übersetzungen und Gedichte
| 
|-
| data-sort-value="A035.000" | II 35
| data-sort-value="460.017" | II
| data-sort-value="1704-07-01" | 1704
| data-sort-value="Geistliche Oden, Sieben und ein Gedicht No. 4" |  No. 4 "Meine Seele lass die Flügel"
| 
| Voice Bc 
| 
| 
| in Deutsche Übersetzungen und Gedichte
| 
|-
| data-sort-value="A036.000" | II 36 
| data-sort-value="460.018" | II
| data-sort-value="1704-07-01" | 1704
| data-sort-value="Geistliche Oden, Sieben und ein Gedicht No. 5" |  No. 5 "Ich stimm' itzund ein Straff-Lied an"
| 
| Voice Bc 
| 
| 
| in Deutsche Übersetzungen und Gedichte
| 
|-
| data-sort-value="A037.000" | II 37
| data-sort-value="460.019" | II
| data-sort-value="1704-07-01" | 1704
| data-sort-value="Geistliche Oden, Sieben und ein Gedicht No. 6" |  No. 6 "Der schwarze Flügel trüber Nacht"
| 
| Voice Bc 
| 
| 
| in Deutsche Übersetzungen und Gedichte
| 
|-
| data-sort-value="A038.000" | II 38
| data-sort-value="460.020" | II
| data-sort-value="1704-07-01" | 1704
| data-sort-value="Geistliche Oden, Sieben und ein Gedicht No. 7" |  No. 7 "Das Finsterniß tritt ein"
| 
| Voice Bc 
| 
| 
| in Deutsche Übersetzungen und Gedichte
| 
|-
| data-sort-value="A039.000" | II 39  
| data-sort-value="460.021" | II
| data-sort-value="1704-07-01" | 1704
| data-sort-value="Geistliche Oden, Sieben und ein Gedicht No. 8" |  No. 8 "Ach was wollt ihr trüben Sinnen"
| 
| Voice Bc 
| 
| 
| in Deutsche Übersetzungen und Gedichte
| 
|-
| data-sort-value="A040.000" | II 40
| data-sort-value="460.022" | II
| data-sort-value="1736-07-01" | 1736
| 
| 
| Voice Kb 
| 
| 
| in 
| 
|-
| data-sort-value="A041.000" | II 41
| data-sort-value="460.023" | II
| data-sort-value="1732-07-01" | 1736
| 
| 
| Voice Kb 
| 
| 
| in 
| 
|-
| data-sort-value="0571.000" | 571
| data-sort-value="461.001" | II
| data-sort-value="1704-07-01" | 
| Fantasia, a.k.a. Concerto
| G maj.
| Organ
| data-sort-value="000.38: 067" | 38: 67
| data-sort-value="IV/11: 035" | IV/11: 35
| 
| 
|-
| data-sort-value="0580.000" | 580
| data-sort-value="461.002" | II
| 
| Fugue
| D maj.
| Organ
| data-sort-value="000.38: 213" | 38: 215
| 
| 
| 
|-
| data-sort-value="A042.000" | II 42 
| data-sort-value="461.003" | II
| 
| 
| F maj.
| Organ
| 
| 
| data-sort-value="in SBB P 0817" | in SBB P 817: 1–3
| 
|-
| data-sort-value="0576.000" | 576 
| data-sort-value="461.004" | II
| 
| Fugue
| G maj.
| Organ
| data-sort-value="000.38: 106" | 38: 106
| IV/11
| 
| 
|-
| data-sort-value="0577.000" | 577 
| data-sort-value="461.005" | II
| 
| Fugue
| G maj.
| Organ
| data-sort-value="000.38: 111" | 38: 111
| data-sort-value="IV/11: 044" | IV/11: 44
| 
| 
|-
| data-sort-value="0581.000" | 581 
| data-sort-value="461.006" | II
| 
| 
| G maj.
| Organ
| 
| IV/11
| by Homilius?
| 
|-
| data-sort-value="0131.a00" | 131a 
| data-sort-value="461.007" | II
| 
| Fugue
| G min.
| Organ
| data-sort-value="000.38: 217" | 38: 217
| data-sort-value="IV/11: 003" | IV/11: 3
| data-sort-value="after BWV 0131/5" | after BWV 131/5
| 
|-
| data-sort-value="0536.A00" | 536a 
| data-sort-value="461.012" | II
| data-sort-value="1774-12-31" | 1760–1789?
| Prelude and Fugue
| A maj.
| Organ
| 
| data-sort-value="IV/06: 114" | IV/6: 114
| data-sort-value="after BWV 0536" | after BWV 536, 152/1; arr. by Scholz?
| 
|- id="BWV 545b"
| data-sort-value="0545.b00" | 545b 
| data-sort-value="461.013" | II
| data-sort-value="1712-12-31" | 1708–1717
| Prelude, Trio and Fugue
| B♭ maj.
| Organ
| 
| data-sort-value="IV/11: 006" | IV/11: 6 
| data-sort-value="after BWV 0545a" | after BWV 545a; ↔ 545, 1029/3
| 
|-
| data-sort-value="0553.000" | 553
| data-sort-value="461.014" | II
| 
| data-sort-value="Short Prelude and Fuguex8 No. 1" | Eight Short Preludes and Fugues No. 1
| C maj.
| Organ
| data-sort-value="000.38: 023" | 38: 23
| IV/11
| by Krebs, J. T. or J. L.?
| 
|-
| data-sort-value="0554.000" | 554
| data-sort-value="461.015" | II
| 
| data-sort-value="Short Prelude and Fuguex8 No. 2" | Eight Short Preludes and Fugues No. 2
| D min.
| Organ
| data-sort-value="000.38: 027" | 38: 27
| IV/11
| by Krebs, J. T. or J. L.?
| 
|-
| data-sort-value="0555.000" | 555
| data-sort-value="461.016" | II
| 
| data-sort-value="Short Prelude and Fuguex8 No. 3" | Eight Short Preludes and Fugues No. 3
| E min.
| Organ
| data-sort-value="000.38: 030" | 38: 30
| IV/11
| by Krebs, J. T. or J. L.?
| 
|-
| data-sort-value="0556.000" | 556
| data-sort-value="461.017" | II
| 
| data-sort-value="Short Prelude and Fuguex8 No. 4" | Eight Short Preludes and Fugues No. 4
| F maj.
| Organ
| data-sort-value="000.38: 033" | 38: 33
| IV/11
| by Krebs, J. T. or J. L.?
| 
|-
| data-sort-value="0557.000" | 557
| data-sort-value="461.018" | II
| 
| data-sort-value="Short Prelude and Fuguex8 No. 5" | Eight Short Preludes and Fugues No. 5
| G maj.
| Organ
| data-sort-value="000.38: 036" | 38: 36
| IV/11
| by Krebs, J. T. or J. L.?
| 
|-
| data-sort-value="0558.000" | 558
| data-sort-value="461.019" | II
| 
| data-sort-value="Short Prelude and Fuguex8 No. 6" | Eight Short Preludes and Fugues No. 6
| G min.
| Organ
| data-sort-value="000.38: 039" | 38: 39
| IV/11
| by Krebs, J. T. or J. L.?
| 
|-
| data-sort-value="0559.000" | 559
| data-sort-value="461.020" | II
| 
| data-sort-value="Short Prelude and Fuguex8 No. 7" | Eight Short Preludes and Fugues No. 7
| A min.
| Organ
| data-sort-value="000.38: 042" | 38: 42
| IV/11
| by Krebs, J. T. or J. L.?
| 
|-
| data-sort-value="0560.000" | 560
| data-sort-value="461.021" | II
| 
| data-sort-value="Short Prelude and Fuguex8 No. 8" | Eight Short Preludes and Fugues No. 8
| B♭ maj.
| Organ
| data-sort-value="000.38: 045" | 38: 45
| IV/11
| by Krebs, J. T. or J. L.?
| 
|-
| data-sort-value="0561.000" | 561
| data-sort-value="461.022" | II
| 
| Fantasia and Fugue
| A min.
| Organ
| data-sort-value="000.38: 048" | 38: 48
| 
| 
| 
|-
| data-sort-value="0584.000" | 584
| data-sort-value="462.002" | II
| 
| 
| G min.
| Organ
| 
| data-sort-value="I/12: 023" | I/12: 23IV/11
| data-sort-value="after BWV 0166/2" | after BWV 166/2
| 
|- id="BWV 1027/1a /2a /4a"
| data-sort-value="1027.a00" | 1027 /1a /2a /4a
| data-sort-value="462.003" | II
| 
| 
| G maj.
| Organ
| 
| IV/11
| after BWV 1027/1–2 /4, 1039/1–2 /4; arr. by Kellner, J. P.?
| 
|-
| data-sort-value="0591.000" | 591
| data-sort-value="462.004" | II
| 
| Kleines harmonisches Labyrinth
| 
| Organ
| data-sort-value="000.38: 225" | 38: 225
| data-sort-value="IV/11: 050" | IV/11: 50
| by Heinichen?
| 
|-
| data-sort-value="0597.000" | 597
| data-sort-value="462.005" | II
| 
| Concerto for solo organ
| E♭ maj.
| Organ
| 
| IV/11
| after lost model?
| 
|-
| data-sort-value="0598.000" | 598
| data-sort-value="462.006" | II
| 
| Pedal-Exercitium (fragment)
| 
| Organ
| data-sort-value="000.38: 210" | 38: 210
| 
| by Bach, C. P. E.?
| 
|-
| data-sort-value="0676.a00" | 676a
| data-sort-value="462.007" | II
| data-sort-value="1763-07-01" | 1739–1789
| chorale setting "Allein Gott in der Höh sei Ehr" (later variant)
| 
| Organ
| data-sort-value="000.40: 208" | 40: 208
| data-sort-value="IV/04: KB 048" | IV/4: KB 48
| data-sort-value="after BWV 0676" | after BWV 676
| 
|-
| data-sort-value="0683.a00" | 683a
| data-sort-value="462.008" | II
| data-sort-value="1763-07-01" | 1739–1789
| chorale setting "Vater unser im Himmelreich" (later variant)
| 
| Organ
| 
| data-sort-value="IV/04: KB 051" | IV/4: KB 51
| data-sort-value="after BWV 0683" | after BWV 683
| 
|-
| data-sort-value="A205.000" | N 205
| data-sort-value="462.009" | II
| 

| data-sort-value="Fantasia" | 

| data-sort-value="C min." |

| data-sort-value="Organ" | 

| 

| 

| see BWV 1121
| 
|-
| data-sort-value="A048.000" | II 48
| data-sort-value="462.010" | II
| 
| chorale setting "Allein Gott in der Höh sei Ehr"
| 
| Organ
| 
| 
| by Walther (& Scholz?)
| 
|-
| data-sort-value="A049.000" | II 49
| data-sort-value="462.011" | II
| 
| chorale setting "Ein feste Burg ist unser Gott"
| 
| Organ
| 
| 
| by Walther?
| 
|-
| data-sort-value="A050.000" | II 50
| data-sort-value="462.012" | II
| 
| chorale setting "Erhalt uns, Herr, hei deinem Wort"
| 
| Organ
| 
| 
| 
| 
|-
| data-sort-value="A051.000" | II 51
| data-sort-value="462.013" | II
| 
| chorale setting "Erstanden ist der heilge Christ"
| 
| Organ
| 
| 
| 
| 
|-
| data-sort-value="A052.000" | II 52
| data-sort-value="462.014" | II
| 
| chorale setting "Freu dich sehr, o meine Seele"
| 
| Organ
| 
| 
| 
| 
|-
| data-sort-value="A053.000" | II 53
| data-sort-value="462.015" | II
| 
| chorale setting "Freu dich sehr, o meine Seele"
| 
| Organ
| 
| 
| 
| 
|-
| rowspan="2" data-sort-value="A054.000" | II 54
| rowspan="2" data-sort-value="462.016" | II
| rowspan="2" | 
| chorale setting "Helft mir Gotts Güte preisen"
| rowspan="2" | 
| rowspan="2" | Organ
| rowspan="2" | 
| rowspan="2" | 
| rowspan="2" | 
| rowspan="2" | 
|-
| chorale setting "Von Gott will ich nicht lassen"
|- style="background: #F6E3CE;" 
| data-sort-value="A055.000" | II 55
| data-sort-value="462.017" | II
| data-sort-value="1715-12-31" | 1714-1717or earlier
| 
| 
| Organ
| 
| 
| 
| 
|-
| data-sort-value="A058.000" | II 58
| data-sort-value="462.020" | II
| 
| chorale setting "Jesu, meine Freude"
| 
| Organ
| 
| 
| 
| 
|-
| data-sort-value="A059.000" | II 59
| data-sort-value="462.021" | II
| 
| chorale setting "Jesu, meine Freude"
| 
| Organ
| 
| 
| 
| 
|-
| data-sort-value="A060.000" | II 60
| data-sort-value="462.022" | II
| 
| 
| 
| Organ
| 
| 
| by Walther?
| 
|-
| data-sort-value="A062.a00" | II 62a
| data-sort-value="462.023" | II
| 
| chorale setting "Sei Lob und Ehr mit hohem Preis"
| 
| Organ
| 
| 
| 
| 
|-
| data-sort-value="A062.b00" | II 62b
| data-sort-value="462.024" | II
| 
| chorale setting "Sei Lob und Ehr mit hohem Preis"
| 
| Organ
| 
| 
| 
| 
|-
| data-sort-value="A063.000" | II 63
| data-sort-value="462.025" | II
| 
| chorale setting "Vom Himmel hoch"
| 
| Organ
| 
| 
| 
| 
|-
| data-sort-value="A064.000" | II 64
| data-sort-value="462.026" | II
| 
| chorale setting "Vom Himmel hoch"
| 
| Organ
| 
| 
| 
| 
|- style="background: #F6E3CE;"
| data-sort-value="A065.000" | II 65
| data-sort-value="462.027" | II
| 
| chorale setting "Vom Himmel hoch"
| 
| Organ
| 
| 
| 
| 
|-
| data-sort-value="A066.000" | II 66
| data-sort-value="462.028" | II
| 
| chorale setting "Wachet auf, ruft uns"
| 
| Organ Tr
| 
| 
| by Krebs, J. L.?
| 
|-
| data-sort-value="A067.000" | II 67
| data-sort-value="462.029" | II
| 
| chorale setting "Was Gott tut, das ist wohlgetan"
| 
| Organ
| 
| 
| 
| 
|-
| data-sort-value="A068.000" | II 68
| data-sort-value="462.030" | II
| 
| chorale setting "Wer nur den lieben Gott läßt walten"
| 
| Organ
| 
| 
| 
| 
|-
| data-sort-value="A069.000" | II 69
| data-sort-value="462.031" | II
| 
| chorale setting "Wir glauben all an einen Gott"
| 
| Organ
| 
| 
| 
| 
|-
| data-sort-value="A070.000" | II 70
| data-sort-value="462.032" | II
| 
| 
| 
| Organ
| 
| 
| 
| 
|-
| data-sort-value="A071.000" | II 71
| data-sort-value="462.033" | II
| 

| data-sort-value="chorale setting Wo Gott der Herr nicht bei uns hält" | 

| 

| data-sort-value="Organ" | 

| 

| 

| see BWV 1128
| 
|-
| data-sort-value="A072.000" | II 72
| data-sort-value="462.034" | II
| 
| chorale setting "Christus der uns selig macht" (Canon)
| 
| Organ
| 
| 
| 
| 
|-
| data-sort-value="A074.000" | II 74
| data-sort-value="462.036" | II
| 
| 
| 
| Organ
| 
| 
| 
| 
|-
| data-sort-value="A075.000" | II 75
| data-sort-value="462.037" | II
| 
| 
| 
| Organ
| 
| 
| 
| 
|-
| data-sort-value="A076.000" | II 76
| data-sort-value="462.038" | II
| 
| 
| 
| Organ
| 
| 
| 
| 
|- style="background: #F6E3CE;" 
| data-sort-value="A077.000" | II 77
| data-sort-value="462.039" | II
| 
| 
| 
| Organ
| 
| 
| 
| 
|-
| data-sort-value="A078.000" | II 78
| data-sort-value="463.001" | II
| 
| 
| 
| Organ
| 
| 
| 
| 
|-
| data-sort-value="A079.000" | II 79
| data-sort-value="463.002" | II
| 
| chorale setting "Befiehl du deine Wege"
| 
| Organ
| 
| 
| 
| 
|-
| data-sort-value="0691.a00" | 691a
| data-sort-value="463.003" | II
| data-sort-value="1754-12-31" | 1720–1789
| chorale setting "Wer nur den lieben Gott läßt walten" (variant)
| 
| Organ
| data-sort-value="000.40: 151" | 40: 151
| 
| data-sort-value="after BWV 0691" | after BWV 691
| 
|- style="background: #F6E3CE;" 
| rowspan= "2" data-sort-value="A206.000" | N 206
| rowspan= "2" data-sort-value="463.004" | II
| rowspan= "2" | 
| 
| rowspan= "2" | 
| rowspan= "2" | Organ
| rowspan= "2" | 
| rowspan= "2" | 
| rowspan= "2" | by Pachelbel (P 376)
| rowspan= "2" | 
|- style="background: #F6E3CE;"
| 
|-
| data-sort-value="A080.000" | II 80
| data-sort-value="463.005" | II
| data-sort-value="1707-12-31" | 1707–1708or earlier
| 
| F maj.
| Keyboard
| 
| V/12
| 
| 
|-
| data-sort-value="0821.000" | 821
| data-sort-value="463.006" | II
| 
| Suite
| B♭ maj.
| Keyboard
| data-sort-value="000.42: 213" | 42: 213
| data-sort-value="V/12: 003" | V/12: 3
| 
| 
|-
| data-sort-value="0834.000" | 834
| data-sort-value="463.007" | II
| 
| Allemande
| C min.
| Keyboard
| data-sort-value="000.42: 259" | 42: 259
| V/12
| 
| 
|-
| data-sort-value="0839.000" | 839
| data-sort-value="463.008" | II
| data-sort-value="1735-03-07" | 1735-03-07or earlier
| 
| G min.
| Keyboard
| 
| V/12
| in Notenbuch der Zeumerin
| 
|-
| data-sort-value="0844.000" | 844
| data-sort-value="463.009" | II
| 
| Toccatina No. 4 Scherzo
| D min.
| Keyboard
| data-sort-value="000.42: 220" | 42: 220 
| data-sort-value="V/12: 016" | V/12: 16
| by Bach, W. F.? ↔ BWV 844a
| 
|-
| data-sort-value="0844.a00" | 844a
| data-sort-value="463.010" | II
| 
| Scherzo
| E min.
| Keyboard
| data-sort-value="000.42: 281" | 42: 281
| data-sort-value="V/12: 022" | V/12: 22
| by Bach, W. F.? (BR A55); ↔ BWV 844
| 
|-
| data-sort-value="0845.000" | 845
| data-sort-value="463.011" | II
| 
| Gigue
| F min.
| Keyboard
| data-sort-value="000.42: 263" | 42: 263
| V/12
| 
| 
|-
| data-sort-value="A081.000" | II 81
| data-sort-value="463.012" | II
| 
|  (incomplete)
| D min.
| Keyboard
| 
| V/12
| by Kellner, J. P.?
| 
|-
| data-sort-value="A082.000" | II 82
| data-sort-value="463.013" | II
| 
| 
| B♭ maj.
| Keyboard
| 
| V/12
| by Bach, J. B.?
| 
|-
| data-sort-value="A083.000" | II 83
| data-sort-value="463.014" | II
| 
| 
| A maj.
| Keyboard
| 
| V/12
| by Bach, J. B. or H.?
| 
|-
| data-sort-value="A084.000" | II 84
| data-sort-value="463.015" | II
| 
| 
| G maj.
| Keyboard
| 
| V/12
| by Bach, J. B.?
| 
|-
| data-sort-value="A085.000" | II 85
| data-sort-value="463.016" | II
| 
| 
| F min.
| Keyboard
| data-sort-value="000.42: XXXV" | 42: XXXV
| V/12: 114, 122
| by Dobenecker?
| 
|-
| data-sort-value="0898.000" | 898
| data-sort-value="463.017" | II
| 
|  on B-A-C-H
| B♭ maj.
| Keyboard
| data-sort-value="000.42: XXXIV" | 42: XXXIV
| V/12
| 
| 
|-
| data-sort-value="A086.000" | II 86
| data-sort-value="463.018" | II
| 
| Fantasia
| C min.
| Keyboard
| data-sort-value="000.42: 243" | 42: 243
| V/12
| by Gronau?
| 
|-
| data-sort-value="A087.000" | II 87
| data-sort-value="464.001" | II
| 
| 
| C maj.
| Keyboard
| 
| V/12
| by Benda?
| 
|-
| data-sort-value="0905.000" | 905
| data-sort-value="464.002" | II
| 
| Fantasia and Fugue
| D min.
| Keyboard
| data-sort-value="000.42: 179" | 42: 179
| data-sort-value="V/12: 024" |  V/12: 24
| 
| 
|-
| data-sort-value="0907.000" | 907
| data-sort-value="464.003" | II
| 
| Fantasia and Fughetta
| B♭ maj.
| Keyboard
| data-sort-value="000.42: 268" | 42: 268
| data-sort-value="V/12: 028" |  V/12: 28
| by ?
| 
|-
| data-sort-value="0908.000" | 908
| data-sort-value="464.004" | II
| 
| Fantasia and Fughetta
| D maj.
| Keyboard
| data-sort-value="000.42: 272" | 42: 272
| data-sort-value="V/12: 034" |  V/12: 34
| by ?
| 
|-
| data-sort-value="0909.000" | 909
| data-sort-value="464.005" | II
| 
| Concerto e Fuga
| C min.
| Keyboard
| data-sort-value="000.42: 190" | 42: 190
| data-sort-value="V/12: 038" |  V/12: 38
| 
| 
|-
| data-sort-value="0919.000" | 919
| data-sort-value="464.006" | II
| 
| Fantasia
| C min.
| Keyboard
| data-sort-value="000.36: 152" | 36: 152
| data-sort-value="V/12: 048" |  V/12: 48
| by Bach, J. B. or J. B. the Younger?
| 
|-
| data-sort-value="0920.000" | 920
| data-sort-value="464.007" | II
| 
| Fantasia
| G min.
| Keyboard
| data-sort-value="000.42: 183" | 42: 183
| V/12
| 
| 
|-
| data-sort-value="0923.a00" | 923a
| data-sort-value="464.008" | II
| 
| Toccatina No. 3 Prelude
| A min.
| Keyboard
| data-sort-value="000.42: 279" | 42: 279
| data-sort-value="V/12: 014" | V/12: 14
| data-sort-value="after BWV 0923" | after BWV 923
| 
|-
| data-sort-value="A089.000" | II 89
| data-sort-value="464.010" | II
| 
| 
| C maj.
| Keyboard
| data-sort-value="000.42: XXXIV" | 42: XXXIV
| V/12
| 
| 
|-
| data-sort-value="A090.000" | II 90
| data-sort-value="464.011" | II
| 
| Fugue
| C maj.
| Kb (with ped?)
| data-sort-value="000.38: 213" | 38: 213
| data-sort-value="IV/11: 058" | IV/11: 58, 61
| by Bach, C. P. E. (H 388) or Pachelbel?
| 
|-
| data-sort-value="A091.000" | II 91
| data-sort-value="464.012" | II
| 
| 
| G maj.
| Keyboard
| data-sort-value="000.42: XXXIV" | 42: XXXIV
| V/12
| 
| 
|-
| data-sort-value="A092.000" | II 92
| data-sort-value="464.013" | II
| 
| 
| G maj.
| Keyboard
| 
| V/12
| 
| 
|-
| data-sort-value="A093.000" | II 93
| data-sort-value="464.014" | II
| 
| 
| E min.
| Keyboard
| data-sort-value="000.42: XXXIV" | 42: XXXIV
| V/12
| 
| 
|-
| data-sort-value="A095.000" | II 95
| data-sort-value="464.016" | II
| 
| 
| E min.
| Keyboard
| data-sort-value="000.42: XXXIV" | 42: XXXIV
| V/12
| 
| 
|-
| data-sort-value="A096.000" | II 96
| data-sort-value="464.017" | II
| 
| 
| D maj.
| Keyboard
| 
| V/12
| by Bach, C. P. E.? (H 373.5)
| 
|-
| data-sort-value="A098.000" | II 98
| data-sort-value="464.018" | II
| 
| 
| D min.
| Keyboard
| 
| V/12
| by Bach, C. P. E.? (H 373.5)
| 
|-
| data-sort-value="A099.000" | II 99
| data-sort-value="464.019" | II
| 
| 
| D min.
| Keyboard
|  
| V/12
| 
| 
|-
| data-sort-value="A100.000" | II 100
| data-sort-value="464.020" | II
| 
| 
| D min.
| Keyboard
| 
| V/12
| by Bach, C. P. E.? (H 373.5)
| 
|-
| data-sort-value="A101.000" | II 101
| data-sort-value="464.021" | II
| 
| 
| G min.
| Keyboard
| data-sort-value="000.42: XXXV" | 42: XXXV
| data-sort-value="V/12: 130" | V/12: 130
| by Dobenecker?
| 
|-
| data-sort-value="A102.000" | II 102
| data-sort-value="464.022" | II
| 
| 
| E♭ min.
| Keyboard
| 
| V/12
| 
| 
|-
| data-sort-value="0897.002" | 897/2
| data-sort-value="464.023" | II
| 
| Fugue
| A min.
| Keyboard
| data-sort-value="000.42: 175" | 42: 175
| V/12
| by Dretzel or Bach, W. F.?
| 
|-
| data-sort-value="0945.000" | 945
| data-sort-value="464.024" | II
| 
| Fugue
| E min.
| Keyboard
| data-sort-value="000.36: 155" | 36: 155
| V/12
| by Graupner?
| 
|-
| data-sort-value="0956.000" | 956
| data-sort-value="464.025" | II
| 
| Fugue
| E min.
| Keyboard
| data-sort-value="000.42: 200" | 42: 200
| data-sort-value="V/12: 070" | V/12: 70
| 
| 
|-
| data-sort-value="0958.000" | 958
| data-sort-value="465.001" | II
| 
| Fugue
| A min.
| Keyboard
| data-sort-value="000.42: 205" | 42: 205
| data-sort-value="V/12: 074" | V/12: 74
|
| 
|-
| data-sort-value="0960.000" | 960
| data-sort-value="465.002" | II
| 
| Fugue (incomplete)
| E min.
| Keyboard
| data-sort-value="000.42: 276" | 42: 276
| V/12
| 
| 
|-
| data-sort-value="A207.000" | N 207
| data-sort-value="465.003" | II
| 
| Fugue
| E min.
| Keyboard
| 
| IV/11
| by Seger?
| 
|-
| data-sort-value="A109.000" | II 109
| data-sort-value="465.011" | II
| 
|  on B-A-C-H
| G min.
| Keyboard
| 
| V/12
| 
| 
|- style="background: #F5F6CE;"
| data-sort-value="0964.000" | 964
| data-sort-value="465.012" | II
| 
| Sonata
| D min.
| Keyboard
| data-sort-value="000.42: 003" | 42: 3
| data-sort-value="V/12: 078" | V/12: 78
| after BWV 1003
| 
|-
| data-sort-value="A111.000" | II 111
| data-sort-value="465.013" | II
| 
| 
| G maj.
| Keyboard
| data-sort-value="000.42: XXXV" | 42: XXXV
| V/12
| 
| 
|- style="background: #F5F6CE;"
| data-sort-value="0968.000" | 968
| data-sort-value="465.014" | II
| 
| Adagio
| G maj.
| Keyboard
| data-sort-value="000.42: 027" | 42: 27
| data-sort-value="V/12: 094" | V/12: 94
| after BWV 1005/1
| 
|-
| data-sort-value="0969.000" | 969
| data-sort-value="465.015" | II
| 
| Toccatina No. 5 Andante
| G min.
| Keyboard
| data-sort-value="000.42: 218" | 42: 218
| data-sort-value="V/12: 018" | V/12: 18
| 
| 
|- style="background: #F5F6CE;" 
| data-sort-value="A113.000" | II 113
| data-sort-value="465.016" | II
| data-sort-value="1725-07-01" | 1725 (AMB)
| data-sort-value="Notebook A. M. Bach (1725) No. 03" | Notebook A. M. Bach (1725) No. 3 Minuet
| F maj.
| Keyboard
| data-sort-value="000.43 2: 025" | 432: 25
| data-sort-value="V/04: 082" | V/4: 82
| 
| 
|- style="background: #F5F6CE;" 
| data-sort-value="A116.000" | II 116
| data-sort-value="465.017" | II
| data-sort-value="1725-07-01" | 1725 (AMB)
| data-sort-value="Notebook A. M. Bach (1725) No. 07" | Notebook A. M. Bach (1725) No. 7 Minuet
| G maj.
| Keyboard
| data-sort-value="000.43 2: 028" | 432: 28
| data-sort-value="V/04: 087" | V/4: 87
| 
| 
|- style="background: #F5F6CE;" 
| data-sort-value="A117.000" | II 117
| data-sort-value="465.018" | II
| data-sort-value="1725-07-01" | 1725 (AMB)
| data-sort-value="Notebook A. M. Bach (1725) No. 08" | Notebook A. M. Bach (1725) No. 8a and 8b two Polonaises
| F maj.
| Keyboard
| data-sort-value="000.43 2: 028" | 432: 28
| data-sort-value="V/04: 088" | V/4: 88
|
| data-sort-value="01427" | 
|- style="background: #F5F6CE;" 
| data-sort-value="A118.000" | II 118
| data-sort-value="465.019" | II
| data-sort-value="1725-07-01" | 1725 (AMB)
| data-sort-value="Notebook A. M. Bach (1725) No. 09" | Notebook A. M. Bach (1725) No. 9 Minuet
| B♭ maj.
| Keyboard
| data-sort-value="000.43 2: 029" | 432: 29
| data-sort-value="V/04: 089" | V/4: 89
| 
| 
|- style="background: #F5F6CE;" 
| data-sort-value="A119.000" | II 119
| data-sort-value="465.020" | II
| data-sort-value="1725-07-01" | 1725 (AMB)
| Notebook A. M. Bach (1725) No. 10 Polonaise
| G min.
| Keyboard
| data-sort-value="000.43 2: 030" | 432: 30
| data-sort-value="V/04: 090" | V/4: 90
| 
| 
|- style="background: #F5F6CE;" 
| data-sort-value="A120.000" | II 120
| data-sort-value="465.021" | II
| data-sort-value="1725-07-01" | 1725 (AMB)
| Notebook A. M. Bach (1725) No. 14 Minuet
| A min.
| Keyboard
| data-sort-value="000.43 2: 031" | 432: 31
| data-sort-value="V/04: 092" | V/4: 92
| 
| 
|- style="background: #F5F6CE;" 
| data-sort-value="A121.000" | II 121
| data-sort-value="465.022" | II
| data-sort-value="1725-07-01" | 1725 (AMB)
| Notebook A. M. Bach (1725) No. 15 Minuet
| C min.
| Keyboard
| data-sort-value="000.43 2: 032" | 432: 32
| data-sort-value="V/04: 092" | V/4: 92
| 
| 
|- style="background: #F5F6CE;" 
| data-sort-value="A126.000" | II 126
| data-sort-value="465.023" | II
| data-sort-value="1725-07-01" | 1725 (AMB)
| Notebook A. M. Bach (1725) No. 22 Musette
| D maj.
| Keyboard
| data-sort-value="000.43 2: 035" | 432: 35
| data-sort-value="V/04: 099" | V/4: 99
| 
| 
|- style="background: #F5F6CE;" 
| data-sort-value="A127.000" | II 127
| data-sort-value="465.024" | II
| data-sort-value="1725-07-01" | 1725 (AMB)
| Notebook A. M. Bach (1725) No. 23 March
| E♭ maj.
| Keyboard
| data-sort-value="000.43 2: 035" | 432: 35
| data-sort-value="V/04: 100" | V/4: 100
| by Bach, C. P. E.
| 
|- style="background: #F5F6CE;" 
| data-sort-value="A128.000" | II 128
| data-sort-value="465.025" | II
| data-sort-value="1725-07-01" | 1725 (AMB)
| Notebook A. M. Bach (1725) No. 24 (Polonaise)
| D min.
| Keyboard
| data-sort-value="000.43 2: 036" | 432: 36
| data-sort-value="V/04: 101" | V/4: 101
| 
| 
|- style="background: #F5F6CE;" 
| data-sort-value="A132.000" | II 132
| data-sort-value="465.026" | II
| data-sort-value="1725-07-01" | 1725 (AMB)
| Notebook A. M. Bach (1725) No. 36 Minuet
| D min.
| Keyboard
| data-sort-value="000.43 2: 048" | 432: 48
| data-sort-value="V/04: 125" | V/4: 125
| 
| 
|-
| data-sort-value="A151.000" | II 151
| data-sort-value="465.027" | II
| 
| Concerto
| C maj.
| Keyboard
| data-sort-value="000.42: XXXIV" | 42: XXXIV
| V/12
| 
| 
|-
| data-sort-value="A152.000" | II 152
| data-sort-value="465.028" | II
| 
| Concerto
| G maj.
| Vl Hc
| data-sort-value="000.42: XXXIV" | 42: XXXIV
| VI/5
| 
| 
|-
| data-sort-value="0990.000" | 990
| data-sort-value="465.029" | II
| 
| Sarabanda con Partitis
| C maj.
| Keyboard
| data-sort-value="000.42: 221" | 42: 221
| data-sort-value="V/12: 097" | V/12: 97
| 
| 
|-
| data-sort-value="A153.000" | II 153
| data-sort-value="465.030" | II
| 
| Sonata
| A maj.
| Vl Bc
| 
| VI/5
| 
| 
|-
| data-sort-value="A154.000" | II 154 
| data-sort-value="466.001" | II
| 
| Sonata
| E♭ maj.
| Vl Hc
| 
| VI/5
| 
| 
|-
| data-sort-value="1020.000" | 1020 
| data-sort-value="466.002" | II
| 
| Sonata
| G min.
| Vl Hc
| data-sort-value="000.09: 274" | 9: 274
| VI/5
| by Bach, C. P. E.? (H 542.5)
| 
|-
| data-sort-value="1022.000" | 1022
| data-sort-value="466.003" | II
| 
| 
| F maj.
| Vl Hc
| 
| data-sort-value="VI/5: 027" | VI/5: 27
| by Bach, C. P. E.?; after BWV 1021; ↔ BWV 1038
| 
|-
| data-sort-value="1024.000" | 1024 
| data-sort-value="466.004" | II
| 
| 
| C min.
| Vl Bc
| 
| VI/5
| 
| 
|-
| data-sort-value="1031.000" | 1031
| data-sort-value="466.005" | II
| 
| Sonata
| E♭ maj.
| Fl Hc
| data-sort-value="000.09: 022" | 9: 22
| data-sort-value="VI/5: 013" | VI/5: 13
| by Bach, C. P. E.? (H 545)
| 
|-
| data-sort-value="1033.000" | 1033
| data-sort-value="466.006" | II
| 
| Sonata
| C maj.
| Fl Bc
| data-sort-value="000.43 1: 003" | 431: 3
| data-sort-value="VI/5: 003" | VI/5: 3
| by Bach, C. P. E.? (H 564.5)
| 
|- style="background: #E3F6CE;"
| data-sort-value="1038.000" | 1038
| data-sort-value="466.007" | II
| data-sort-value="1734-01-01" | 1732–1735
| Sonata
| G maj.
| Fl Vl Bc
| data-sort-value="000.09: 219" | 9: 219
| data-sort-value="VI/5: 045" | VI/5: 45
| by Bach, C. P. E.? (H 590.5); after BWV 1021; ↔ BWV 1022
| 
|- id="BWV 525a"
| data-sort-value="0525.a00" | 525a 
| data-sort-value="466.008" | II
| 
| Concerto (Trio sonata)
| C maj.
| Vl Vc Bc
| 
| VI/5
| data-sort-value="after BWV 0525, 1032" | after BWV 525/1, 1032/2, 525/3
| 
|-
| data-sort-value="A155.000" | II 155
| data-sort-value="466.009" | II
| 
| Concerto 
| A maj.
| Kb Str Bc
| 
| VI/5
| 
| 
|-
| data-sort-value="A022.000" | I 22
| data-sort-value="466.010" | II
| 
| 
| B♭ maj.
| Ob Vl Str Bc
| 
| VI/5
| by Förster (C.?)?
| 
|-
| data-sort-value="1070.000" | 1070
| data-sort-value="466.011" | II
| 
| data-sort-value="Orchestral Suite No. 5" | Orchestral Suite (No. 5)
| G min.
| Str Bc
| data-sort-value="000.45 1: 190" | 451: 190
| VI/5
| by Bach, W. F.?
| 
|- id="BWV Anhang III" style="background: #D8D8D8;"
| data-sort-value="A155.999" | Anh. III
| data-sort-value="467.000" colspan="8" | Works of other composers, spuriously attributed to Bach
| data-sort-value="1466a" | Up ↑
|-
| data-sort-value="A156.000" | III 156
| data-sort-value="467.001" | III
| 
| Cantata Herr Christ, der einge Gottes Sohn (Annunciation)
| 
| SATB Str Bc
| 
| 
| data-sort-value="by Telemann (TWV 1:0732)" | by Telemann (TWV 1:732)
| 
|-
| data-sort-value="A157.000" | III 157
| data-sort-value="467.002" | III
| 
| Cantata Ich habe Lust zu scheiden (Purification)
| 
| data-sort-value="s Flx2 Str Bc" | s 2Fl Str Bc
| 
| 
| data-sort-value="by Telemann (TWV 1:0836)" | by Telemann (TWV 1:836)
| 
|- style="background: #E3F6CE;"
| data-sort-value="0015.000" | 15
| data-sort-value="467.003" | III
| 1726-04-21(JSB)
| Cantata Denn du wirst meine Seele nicht in der Hölle lassen (Easter)
| 
| data-sort-value="satbSATB Trx3 Tmp Str Bc" | satbSATB 3Tr Tmp Str Bc
| data-sort-value="000.02: 135" | 2: 135
| I/41
| by Bach, J. L. (JLB 21); text in 
| 
|-
| data-sort-value="0141.000" | 141
| data-sort-value="467.004" | III
| 
| Cantata Das ist je gewißlich wahr (3rd Sunday of Advent)
| 
| data-sort-value="atbSATB Obx2 Str Bc" | atbSATB 2Ob Str Bc
| data-sort-value="000.30: 003" | 30: 3
| I/41
| data-sort-value="by Telemann (TWV 1:0183)" | by Telemann (TWV 1:183)
| 
|-
| data-sort-value="0145.b00" | 145/b
| data-sort-value="467.005" | III
| 
| Cantata movement So du mit deinem Munde bekennest Jesum (Easter)
| D maj.
| data-sort-value="SATB Tr Str Bc" | SATB Tr Str Bc
| data-sort-value="000.30: 096" | 30: 96
| I/10: 142
| data-sort-value="by Telemann (TWV 1:1350/1)" | by Telemann (TWV 1:1350/1)
| 
|-
| data-sort-value="0160.000" | 160
| data-sort-value="467.006" | III
| data-sort-value="1728-12-31" | 1725–1732?
| Cantata Ich weiß, daß mein Erlöser lebt (Easter)
| C maj.
| t Vl Bas Bc
| data-sort-value="000.32: 171" | 32: 171
| I/41
| data-sort-value="by Telemann (TWV 1:0877)" | by Telemann (TWV 1:877)
| 
|-
| data-sort-value="0218.000" | 218
| data-sort-value="467.007" | III
| 
| Cantata Gott der Hoffnung erfülle euch (Pentecost)
| 
| data-sort-value="satbSATB Hnx2 Str Bc" | satbSATB 2Hn Str Bc 
| data-sort-value="000.41: 223" | 41: 223
| 
| data-sort-value="by Telemann (TWV 1:0634)" | by Telemann (TWV 1:634)
| 
|-
| data-sort-value="0219.000" | 219
| data-sort-value="467.008" | III
| 
| Cantata Siehe, es hat überwunden der Löwe (Michaelmas)
| 
| sabSATB Str Bc
| data-sort-value="000.41: 239" | 41: 239
| 
| data-sort-value="by Telemann (TWV 1:1328)" | by Telemann (TWV 1:1328)
| 
|-
| data-sort-value="0222.000" | 222
| data-sort-value="467.009" | III
| 
| Cantata Mein Odem ist schwach (Purification)
| 
| sabSATB Str Bc
| 
| 
| by Bach, J. Ernst; → BWV Anh. 165
| 
|-
| data-sort-value="A158.000" | III 158
| data-sort-value="467.010" | III
| 
| Aria "Andrò dall'colle al Prato"
| 
| data-sort-value="s Flx2 (Hnx2) Str Bc" | s 2Fl (2Hn) Str Bc
| 
| 
| by Bach, J. C.
| 
|-
| data-sort-value="A160.000" | III 160
| data-sort-value="467.012" | III
| data-sort-value="1752-12-31" | 1750–1755? (Harrer?)
| Motet Jauchzet dem Herrn alle Welt, TWV 8:10
| C maj.
| data-sort-value="SATBx2" | 2SATB
| 
| data-sort-value="III/03: 015" | III/3: 15
| after Telemann (/1; /3 after TWV 1:1066), BWV 28/2 (/2 = BWV 28/2a); text after Psalm 100
| 
|-
| data-sort-value="A161.000" | III 161
| data-sort-value="467.013" | III
| 
| Motet Kündlich groß ist das gottselige Geheimnis/1 (Christmas)
| D maj.
| SATB Str? Bc
| 
| data-sort-value="III/03" | III/3
| by Graun (C. H.?), precedes laudes A and B of BWV 243a
| 
|-
| data-sort-value="A162.000" | III 162
| data-sort-value="467.014" | III
| 
| Motet Lob und Ehre und Weisheit und Dank
| 
| data-sort-value="SATBx2" | 2SATB
| 
| data-sort-value="III/03" | III/3
| by Wagner, G. G.
| 
|-
| data-sort-value="A163.000" | III 163
| data-sort-value="467.015" | III
| 
| Motet Merk auf, mein Herz, und sieh dorthin
| 
| data-sort-value="SATBx2" | 2SATB
| 
| data-sort-value="III/03" | III/3
| by Bach, J. B. or J. Ernst
| 
|-
| data-sort-value="A164.000" | III 164	
| data-sort-value="467.016" | III
| 
| 
| 
| SSATB
| 
| data-sort-value="III/03: 052" | III/3: 52
| by Altnickol
| 
|-
| data-sort-value="A165.000" | III 165
| data-sort-value="467.017" | III
| 
| Motet Unser Wandel ist im Himmel
| 
| SATB
| 
| data-sort-value="III/03" | III/3
| by Bach, J. Ernst; after BWV 222/3 /4 /6
| 
|- style="background: #E3F6CE;"
| data-sort-value="A166.000" | III 166
| data-sort-value="467.018" | III
| data-sort-value="1729-07-01" | 1729 (JSB)
| Kyrie–Gloria Mass Missa sopra cantilena "Allein Gott in der Höh' sei Ehr"
| E min.
| SSATB 2Vl 2Vla Vc Bc
| data-sort-value="000.11 1: XV" | 111: XV41: 276
| II/9
| by Bach, J. L. (JLB 38), start of Gloria arr. by Bach
| 
|- style="background: #E3F6CE;"
| data-sort-value="A024.000" | II 24
| data-sort-value="467.020" | III
| data-sort-value="1724-01-01" | 1715–1717, 1724 (JSB)
| Kyrie–Gloria Mass
| A min.
| SATB Str Bc
| data-sort-value="000.11 1: XV" | 111: XV
| II/9
| after Missa Sancti Lamberti by Pez, J. C.
| 
|- id="BWV Anh. 26" style="background: #E3F6CE;"
| data-sort-value="A026.000" | II 26
| data-sort-value="467.021" | III
| data-sort-value="1729-12-31" | 1727–1732 (JSB)
| 
| C min.
| data-sort-value="satbSATB Tbnx3 Vlx2 Bc" | satbSATB 3Tbn 2Vl Bc
| data-sort-value="000.41: 193" | 41: 193111: XVI
| data-sort-value="II/02: 295" | II/2: 295
| by Durante (alternative Christe: BWV 242)
| 
|- style="background: #F6E3CE;" 
| data-sort-value="A027.000" | II 27
| data-sort-value="467.022" | III
| data-sort-value="1745-07-01" | ? (JLK)
| Sanctus
| F maj.
| data-sort-value="SATB Hnx2 Obx2 Str Bc" | SATB 2Hn 2Ob Str Bc
| data-sort-value="000.11 1: XVII" | 111: XVII
| II/9
| by Krebs, J. L. (Krebs‑WV 104)
| 
|- id="BWV Anh. 168" style="background: #F5F6CE;"
| data-sort-value="A168.000" | III 168
| data-sort-value="467.023" | III
| data-sort-value="1747-07-01" | ? (WFB)
| Kyrie and German Gloria
| G min.
| sSATB Str Bc
| data-sort-value="000.11 1: XVII" | 111: XVII
| II/9
| by Bach, W. F. (BR E1 F 100)
| 
|-
| data-sort-value="A021.000" | I 21
| data-sort-value="467.024" | III
| data-sort-value="1707-07-01" |  (MH)
| Magnificat Meine Seel erhebt den Herren
| A min.
| data-sort-value="s Fl Vlx2 Bc" | s Fl 2Vl Bc
| data-sort-value="000.11 1: XVIII" | 111: XVIII
| II/9
| by Hoffmann, M.
| 
|-
| data-sort-value="A169.000" | III 169
| data-sort-value="468.001" | III
| data-sort-value="1724-01-01" | 1724–1725
| Passion Erbauliche Gedanken auf den Grünen Donnerstag und Charfreitag über den Leidenden Jesum
| 
| 
| 
|
| text by Picander partly used in BWV 244 but no other known setting
| 
|- id="BWV 8/6" style="background: #E3F6CE;"
| data-sort-value="0008.106" rowspan="3" | 8/6
| data-sort-value="468.002" rowspan="3" | III
| data-sort-value="1724-09-24" rowspan="3" | 1713 (Vet.)1724-09-24(JSB)
| rowspan="3" | chorale setting "Liebster Gott, wenn werd ich sterben" (s. 5)
| rowspan="2" | E maj.
| rowspan="3" | SATB
| data-sort-value="000.01: 241" rowspan="2" | 1: 241
| data-sort-value="I/23: 161" | I/23: 161
| rowspan="3" | by Vetter, D. (Z 6634); text by Neumann
| 
|- style="background: #E3F6CE;"
| data-sort-value="III/02 1: 088" | III/2.1: 63III/2.2: 25
| 
|- style="background: #E3F6CE;"
| D maj.
| 
| data-sort-value="I/23: 219" | I/23: 219
| 
|- id="BWV Anh. 170" style="background: #E3F6CE;"
| data-sort-value="0027.006" | 27/6
| data-sort-value="468.003" rowspan="2" | III
| data-sort-value="1726-10-06" rowspan="2" | 1652 (Ros.)1726-10-06(JSB)
| rowspan="2" | chorale setting "Welt, ade, ich bin dein müde" (s. 1)
| rowspan="2" | B♭ maj.
| rowspan="2" | SSATB
| data-sort-value="000.05 1: 244" rowspan="2" | 51: 244
| data-sort-value="I/23: 251" | I/23: 251
| rowspan="2" | by Rosenmüller (Z 6531); text by Albinus
| 
|- style="background: #E3F6CE;"
| data-sort-value="A170.000" | III 170
| data-sort-value="III/02 2: 086" | III/2.2: 86
| 
|- style="background: #E3F6CE;"
| data-sort-value="0043.011" rowspan="2" | 43/11
| data-sort-value="468.004" rowspan="2" | III
| data-sort-value="1726-05-30" rowspan="2" | 1652 (Pet.)1726-05-30 (JSB)
|  (ss. 1, 13)
| rowspan="2" | G maj.
| rowspan="2" | SATB
| data-sort-value="000.10: 126" rowspan="2" | 10: 126
| data-sort-value="I/12: 164" | I/12: 164
| rowspan="2" | by  after Z 5741b; text by Rist
| rowspan="2" | 
|- style="background: #E3F6CE;"
| chorale setting "Ermuntre dich, mein schwacher Geist"
| data-sort-value="III/02 1: 107" | III/2.1: 74III/2.2: 57
|- style="background: #F6E3CE;"
| data-sort-value="0567.000" | 567	
| data-sort-value="468.005" | III
| 
| Prelude
| C maj.
| Organ
| data-sort-value="000.38: 084" | 38: 84
| IV/11
| by Krebs, J. L. (Krebs‑WV 401)
| 
|-
| data-sort-value="A178.000" | III 178	
| data-sort-value="468.006" | III
| data-sort-value="1685-01-01" | last third of 17th century
| Toccata quasi Fantasia con Fuge
| A maj.
| Organ
| data-sort-value="000.42: 250" | 42: 250
| V/12
| by Reincken?
| 
|-
| data-sort-value="A043.000" | II 43		
| data-sort-value="468.007" | III
| data-sort-value="1788-07-01" | 
| 
| B min.
| Organ
| 
| IV/11
| 
|-
| data-sort-value="A044.000" | II 44			
| data-sort-value="468.008" | III
| 
| 
| G maj.
| Organ
| 
| IV/11
| by Kellner, J. P. or J. C.
| 
|-
| data-sort-value="A045.000" | II 45				
| data-sort-value="468.009" | III
| data-sort-value="1799-07-01" | 
|  on B-A-C-H
| B♭ maj.
| Organ
| 
| IV/11
| by Knecht
| 
|-
| data-sort-value="A088.000" | II 88				
| data-sort-value="468.010" | III
| data-sort-value="1765-07-01" | 1765
| 
| C maj.
| Keyboard
| 
| V/12
| by Kellner, J. C.
| 
|-
| data-sort-value="A097.000" | II 97					
| data-sort-value="468.011" | III
| 
| 
| F♯ maj.
| Keyboard
| data-sort-value="000.42: XXXV" | 42: XXXV
| data-sort-value="IV/11: 63" | IV/11: 63
| by Krebs, J. L. (Krebs‑WV 409/2)
| 
|-
| data-sort-value="A103.000" | II 103 					
| data-sort-value="468.012" | III
| data-sort-value="1714-12-31" |  (GFH)
| 
| A min.
| Keyboard
| 
| V/12
| by Handel
| 
|-
| data-sort-value="A104.000" | II 104 					
| data-sort-value="468.013" | III
| data-sort-value="1714-12-31" |  (GFH)
| 
| C min.
| Keyboard
| 
| V/12
| by Handel
| 
|-
| data-sort-value="A105.000" | II 105 					
| data-sort-value="468.014" | III
| data-sort-value="1714-12-31" |  (GFH)
| 
| B♭ maj.
| Keyboard
| 
| V/12
| by Handel
| 
|-
| data-sort-value="A106.000" | II 106					
| data-sort-value="468.015" | III
| data-sort-value="1714-12-31" |  (GFH)
| 
| G min.
| Keyboard
| 
| V/12
| by Handel
| 
|-
| data-sort-value="A208.000" | N 208		
| data-sort-value="468.016" | III
| data-sort-value="1747-07-01" | 1747 (JEE)
| Fugue
| E♭ min.
| Keyboard
| 
| IV/11
| After  by Eberlin
| 
|-
| data-sort-value="A046.000" | II 46					
| data-sort-value="468.017" | III
| 
| 
| C min.
| Organ
| 
| IV/11
| by Krebs, J. T.
| 
|-
| data-sort-value="0692.000" | 692		
| data-sort-value="468.018" | III
| 
| chorale setting "Ach Gott und Herr" (Kirnb. coll. No. 3)
| C maj.
| Organ
| data-sort-value="000.40: 004" | 40: 4
| IV/11
| by Walther; after BWV 692a
| 
|- style="background: #F6E3CE;"
| data-sort-value="0692.a00" | 692a		
| data-sort-value="468.019" | III
| 
| chorale setting "Ach Gott und Herr" (early version)
| C maj.
| Organ
| data-sort-value="000.40: 152" | 40: 152
| IV/11
| by Walther; → BWV 692
| 
|-
| data-sort-value="0693.000" | 693		
| data-sort-value="468.020" | III
| 
| chorale setting "Ach Gott und Herr" (Kirnb. coll. No. 4)
| C maj.
| Organ
| data-sort-value="000.40: 005" | 40: 5
| IV/11
| by Walther
| 
|-
| data-sort-value="0746.000" | 746		
| data-sort-value="468.021" | III
| data-sort-value="1715-07-01" | 1715 or earlier (JCFF)
| chorale setting "Christ ist erstanden"
| D min.
| Organ
| data-sort-value="000.40: 173" | 40: 173
| IV/10
| by Fischer ( No. 24)
| 
|-
| data-sort-value="0748.000" | 748		
| data-sort-value="468.022" | III
| data-sort-value="1719-12-31" | 1700–1739
| chorale setting "Gott der Vater wohn uns bei"
| D maj.
| Organ
| data-sort-value="000.40: 177" | 40: 177
| IV/10
| by Walther; → BWV 748a
| 
|-
| data-sort-value="0748.A00" | 748a		
| data-sort-value="468.023" | III
| data-sort-value="1744-12-31" | 1700–1789
| chorale setting "Gott der Vater wohn uns bei" (variant)
| D maj.
| Organ
| 
| IV/10
| by Scholz (arr.)?; after BWV 748
| 
|-
| data-sort-value="0751.000" | 751		
| data-sort-value="468.024" | III
| 
|  (also in Neumeister Collection)
| 
| Organ
| 
| IV/10
| by Bach, J. Michael
| 
|-
| data-sort-value="0759.000" | 759		
| data-sort-value="468.025" | III
| 
| chorale setting "Schmücke dich, o liebe Seele"
| F maj.
| Organ
| data-sort-value="000.40: 181" | 40: 181
| IV/10
| by Homilius
| 
|- style="background: #E3F6CE;"
| data-sort-value="0760.000" | 760			
| data-sort-value="468.026" | III
| 
| chorale setting "Vater unser im Himmelreich"
| 
| Organ
| data-sort-value="000.40: 183" | 40: 183
| IV/10
| by Böhm
| 
|- style="background: #E3F6CE;" 
| data-sort-value="0761.000" | 761			
| data-sort-value="468.027" | III
| 
| chorale setting "Vater unser im Himmelreich"
| 
| Organ
| data-sort-value="000.40: 184" | 40: 184
| IV/10
| by Böhm
| 
|- id="BWV 1096"
| rowspan="2" | 1096				
| rowspan="2" data-sort-value="468.028" | III
| rowspan="2" | 
|  (3 versions; Neumeister Chorales No. 8)
| rowspan="2" | A min.
| rowspan="2" | Organ
| rowspan="2" | 
| rowspan="2" data-sort-value="IV/09: 016" | IV/9: 16, 76
| rowspan="2" | by Pachelbel?
| rowspan="2" | 
|-
|  (3 versions; Neumeister Chorales No. 8)
|-
| data-sort-value="0771.000" | 771					
| data-sort-value="468.029" | III
| 
| chorale setting "Allein Gott in der Höh sei Ehr"
| G maj.
| Organ
| data-sort-value="000.40: 195" | 40: 195
| IV/11
| by Vetter, A. N.
| 
|-
| rowspan="2" data-sort-value="A047.000" | II 47			
| rowspan="2" data-sort-value="468.030" | III
| rowspan="2" | 
| 
| rowspan="2" | A min.
| rowspan="2" | Organ
| rowspan="2" | 
| rowspan="2" | IV/10
| rowspan="2" | by Kellner, J. P.
| rowspan="2" | 
|-
| 
|-
| data-sort-value="A056.000" | II 56 				
| data-sort-value="468.031" | III
| data-sort-value="1735-07-01" | 1735 (Telem.)
| 
| 
| Organ
| 
| IV/10
| by Telemann (TWV 31:8)
| 
|- style="background: #F6E3CE;"
| data-sort-value="A057.000" | II 57	 				
| data-sort-value="468.032" | III
| 
| 
| 
| Organ
| 
| IV/10
| by Vogler
| 
|-
| data-sort-value="A061.000" | II 61				
| data-sort-value="468.033" | III
| 
| 
| F maj.
| Organ
| 
| IV/10
| by Pachelbel (P 396)
| 
|-
| data-sort-value="A073.000" | II 73				
| data-sort-value="468.034" | III
| data-sort-value="1753-07-01" | 1720–1788
| 
| F min.
| Organ
| 
| IV/10
| by Bach, C. P. E.; after BWV 639
| 
|-
| data-sort-value="A171.000" | III 171					
| data-sort-value="468.035" | III
| 
| 
| 
| Organ
| data-sort-value="000.40: 174" | 40: 174
| IV/10
| by Pachelbel (P 58)
| 
|-
| data-sort-value="A172.000" | III 172						
| data-sort-value="468.036" | III
| 
| 
| G maj.
| Organ
| 
| IV/10
| by Krebs, J. L. (Krebs‑WV 524)
| 
|- style="background: #F5F6CE;"
| data-sort-value="0824.000" | 824						
| data-sort-value="468.037" | III
| data-sort-value="1720-07-01" | 1720 (WFB)
| data-sort-value="Klavierbüchlein für Wilhelm Friedemann Bach No. 47" | Klavierbüchlein WFB No. 47: Suite
| A maj.
| Keyboard
| data-sort-value="000.36: 231" | 36: 231
| data-sort-value="V/05: 078" | V/5: 78
| by Telemann (TWV 32:14)
| 
|-
| data-sort-value="0835.000" | 835
| data-sort-value="468.038" | III
| data-sort-value="1761-07-01" | 1761 (Kirnb.)
| Allemande
| A min.
| Keyboard
| data-sort-value="000.42: 267" | 42: 267
| V/12
| by Kirnberger (EngK 74)
| 
|-
| data-sort-value="0838.000" | 838
| data-sort-value="468.039" | III
| 
| Allemande and Courante
| A maj.
| Keyboard
| data-sort-value="000.42: 265" | 42: 265
| V/12
| by Graupner (GWV 849/2 /3)
| 
|-
| data-sort-value="0840.000" | 840
| data-sort-value="469.001" | III
|
| 
| G maj.
| Keyboard
|
| V/12
| by Telemann (TWV 32:13/2)
| 
|-
| data-sort-value="0897.001" | 897/1
| data-sort-value="469.002" | III
| data-sort-value="1739-12-31" |  (CHD)
| Prelude
| A min.
| Keyboard
| data-sort-value="000.42: 173" | 42: 173
| V/12
| by Dretzel ("Adagiosissimo")
| 
|-
| data-sort-value="0962.000" | 962
| data-sort-value="469.003" | III
| data-sort-value="1783-07-01" |  (JGA)
| Fugue
| E min.
| Keyboard
| data-sort-value="000.42: 198" | 42: 198
| V/12
| by Albrechtsberger (Op. 1/8)
| 
|-
| data-sort-value="0970.000" | 970
| data-sort-value="469.004" | III
|
| Toccatina No. 6 Presto
| D min.
| Keyboard
| data-sort-value="000.42: XXXIV" | 42: XXXIV
| V/12
| by Bach, W. F. (BR A49 F 25/2)
| 
|-
| data-sort-value="A094.000" | II 94
| data-sort-value="469.005" | III
| data-sort-value="1774-07-01" | 1774 (Kirnb.)
| 
| E min.
| Keyboard
| data-sort-value="000.42: XXXIV" | 42: XXXIV
| V/12
| by Kirnberger (EngK 35)
| 
|-
| data-sort-value="A107.000" | II 107	
| data-sort-value="469.006" | III
| 
|  on B-A-C-H
| C maj.
| Keyboard
| data-sort-value="000.42: XXXIV" | 42: XXXIV
| V/12
| by Sorge?
| 
|-
| data-sort-value="A108.000" | II 108	
| data-sort-value="469.007" | III
|
|  on B-A-C-H
| C maj.
| Keyboard
| data-sort-value="000.42: XXXIV" | 42: XXXIV
| V/12
| by Bach, C. P. E. (H 373) or Sorge?
| 
|-
| data-sort-value="A110.000" | II 110	
| data-sort-value="469.008" | III
|
|  on B-A-C-H
| C min.
| Keyboard
| data-sort-value="000.42: XXXIV" | 42: XXXIV
| V/12
| by Sorge?
| 
|-
| data-sort-value="A112.000" | II 112
| data-sort-value="469.009" | III
| data-sort-value="1780-07-01" | 1780 (Kirnb.)
| 
| E min.
| Keyboard
| 
| V/12
| by Kirnberger (EngK 16)
| 
|- style="background: #F5F6CE;" 
| data-sort-value="A114.000" | II 114
| data-sort-value="469.010" | III
| data-sort-value="1725-07-01" | 
| data-sort-value="Notebook A. M. Bach (1725) No. 04 Minuet" | Notebook A. M. Bach (1725) No. 4 Minuet
| G maj.
| Keyboard
| data-sort-value="000.43 2: 026" | 432: 26
| data-sort-value="V/04: 083" | V/4: 83
| by Petzold
| 
|- style="background: #F5F6CE;" 
| data-sort-value="A115.000" | II 115
| data-sort-value="469.011" | III
| data-sort-value="1725-07-01" | 1725 (AMB)
| data-sort-value="Notebook A. M. Bach (1725) No. 05 Minuet" | Notebook A. M. Bach (1725) No. 5 Minuet
| G min.
| Keyboard
| data-sort-value="000.43 2: 026" | 432: 26
| data-sort-value="V/04: 084" | V/4: 84
| by Petzold
| 
|- style="background: #F5F6CE;" 
| data-sort-value="A122.000" | II 122
| data-sort-value="469.012" | III
| data-sort-value="1725-07-01" | 
| Notebook A. M. Bach (1725) No. 16 March
| D maj.
| Keyboard
| data-sort-value="000.43 2: 032" | 432: 32
| data-sort-value="V/04: 094" | V/4: 94
| data-sort-value="by Bach, C. P. E. (H 001.1)" | by Bach, C. P. E. (H 1/1)
| 
|- style="background: #F5F6CE;" 
| data-sort-value="A123.000" | II 123
| data-sort-value="469.013" | III
| data-sort-value="1725-07-01" | 1725 (CPE)
| Notebook A. M. Bach (1725) No. 17 Polonaise
| G min.
| Keyboard
| data-sort-value="000.43 2: 032" | 432: 32
| data-sort-value="V/04: 095" | V/4: 95
| data-sort-value="by Bach, C. P. E. (H 001.2)" | by Bach, C. P. E. (H 1/2)
| 
|- style="background: #F5F6CE;" 
| data-sort-value="A124.000" | II 124
| data-sort-value="469.014" | III
| data-sort-value="1725-07-01" | 1725 (CPE)
| Notebook A. M. Bach (1725) No. 18 March
| G maj.
| Keyboard
| data-sort-value="000.43 2: 033" | 432: 33
| data-sort-value="V/04: 096" | V/4: 96
| data-sort-value="by Bach, C. P. E. (H 001.3)" | by Bach, C. P. E. (H 1/3)
| 
|- style="background: #F5F6CE;" 
| data-sort-value="A125.000" | II 125
| data-sort-value="469.015" | III
| data-sort-value="1725-07-01" | 1725 (CPE)
| Notebook A. M. Bach (1725) No. 19 Polonaise
| G min.
| Keyboard
| data-sort-value="000.43 2: 033" | 432: 33
| data-sort-value="V/04: 097" | V/4: 97
| data-sort-value="by Bach, C. P. E. (H 001.4)" | by Bach, C. P. E. (H 1/4)
| 
|- style="background: #F5F6CE;" 
| data-sort-value="A129.000" | II 129
| data-sort-value="469.016" | III
| data-sort-value="1725-07-01" | 1725 (AMB)
| Notebook A. M. Bach (1725) No. 27 Solo per il cembalo
| E maj.
| Keyboard
| data-sort-value="000.43 2: 038" | 432: 38
| data-sort-value="V/04: 104" | V/4: 104
| data-sort-value="by Bach, C. P. E. (H 016.0" | by Bach, C. P. E. (H 16)
| 
|- style="background: #F5F6CE;" 
| data-sort-value="A130.000" | II 130
| data-sort-value="469.017" | III
| data-sort-value="1725-07-01" | 1725 (AMB)
| Notebook A. M. Bach (1725) No. 28 Polonaise
| G maj.
| Keyboard
| data-sort-value="000.43 2: 039" | 432: 39
| data-sort-value="V/04: 106" | V/4: 106
| by Hasse
| 
|- style="background: #F5F6CE;" 
| data-sort-value="A131.000" | II 131
| data-sort-value="469.018" | III
| data-sort-value="1745-07-01" | 1745?
| Notebook A. M. Bach (1725) No. 32
| F maj.
| Keyboard
| data-sort-value="000.43 2: 046" | 432: 46
| data-sort-value="V/04: 121" | V/4: 121
| by Bach, J. C. (W A22)
| 
|-
| data-sort-value="A133.000" | II 133
| data-sort-value="469.019" | III
| data-sort-value="1763-12-31" | 1763 or later
| data-sort-value="Musical clock, No. 01" |  No. 1 Fantasia
| G maj.
| Musical clock
|
| V/12
| by Bach, W. F. (BR A63 F 207)
| 
|-
| data-sort-value="A134.000" | II 134
| data-sort-value="469.020" | III
| data-sort-value="1763-12-31" | 1763 or later
| data-sort-value="Musical clock, No. 02" |  No. 2 Scherzo
| G maj.
| Musical clock
|
| V/12
| by Bach, W. F. (BR A64 F 207)
| 
|-
| data-sort-value="A135.000" | II 135
| data-sort-value="469.021" | III
| data-sort-value="1763-12-31" | 1763 or later
| data-sort-value="Musical clock, No. 03" |  No. 3 Bourlesca
| A min.
| Musical clock
|
| V/12
| by Bach, W. F. (BR A65 F 207)
| 
|-
| data-sort-value="A136.000" | II 136
| data-sort-value="469.022" | III
| data-sort-value="1763-12-31" | 1763 or later
| data-sort-value="Musical clock, No. 04" |  No. 4 Trio
| A min.
| Musical clock
|
| V/12
| by Bach, W. F. (BR A66 F 207)
| 
|-
| data-sort-value="A137.000" | II 137
| data-sort-value="469.023" | III
| data-sort-value="1763-12-31" | 1763 or later
| data-sort-value="Musical clock, No. 05" |  No. 5 L'Intrada della Caccia
| E♭ maj.
| Musical clock
|
| V/12
| by Bach, W. F. (BR A67 F 207)
| 
|-
| data-sort-value="A138.000" | II 138
| data-sort-value="469.024" | III
| data-sort-value="1763-12-31" | 1763 or later
| data-sort-value="Musical clock, No. 06" |  No. 6 Continuazione della Caccia
| E♭ maj.
| Musical clock
|
| V/12
| by Bach, W. F. (BR A68 F 207)
| 
|-
| data-sort-value="A139.000" | II 139
| data-sort-value="469.025" | III
| data-sort-value="1763-12-31" | 1763 or later
| data-sort-value="Musical clock, No. 07" |  No. 7 Il Fine delle Caccia I
| D maj.
| Musical clock
|
| V/12
| by Bach, W. F. (BR A69 F 207)
| 
|-
| data-sort-value="A140.000" | II 140
| data-sort-value="469.026" | III
| data-sort-value="1763-12-31" | 1763 or later
| data-sort-value="Musical clock, No. 08" |  No. 8 Il Fine delle Caccia II
| D min.
| Musical clock
|
| V/12
| by Bach, W. F. (BR A70 F 207)
| 
|-
| data-sort-value="A141.000" | II 141
| data-sort-value="469.027" | III
| data-sort-value="1763-12-31" | 1763 or later
| data-sort-value="Musical clock, No. 09" |  No. 9 Song "O Gott die Christenheit"
| F maj.
| Musical clock
|
| V/12
| by Bach, W. F. (BR A71 F 207)
| 
|-
| data-sort-value="A142.000" | II 142
| data-sort-value="469.028" | III
| data-sort-value="1763-12-31" | 1763 or later
|  No. 10 Psalm 110
| A min.
| Musical clock
|
| V/12
| by Bach, W. F. (BR A72 F 207)
| 
|-
| data-sort-value="A143.000" | II 143
| data-sort-value="469.029" | III
| data-sort-value="1763-12-31" | 1763 or later
|  No. 11 Polonaise
| E min.
| Musical clock
|
| V/12
| by Bach, W. F. (BR A73 F 207)
| 
|-
| data-sort-value="A144.000" | II 144
| data-sort-value="469.030" | III
| data-sort-value="1763-12-31" | 1763 or later
|  No. 12 Polonaise Trio
| A min.
| Musical clock
|
| V/12
| by Bach, W. F. (BR A74 F 207)
| 
|-
| data-sort-value="A145.000" | II 145
| data-sort-value="469.031" | III
| data-sort-value="1763-12-31" | 1763 or later
|  No. 13 March
| C maj.
| Musical clock
|
| V/12
| by Bach, W. F. (BR A75 F 207)
| 
|-
| data-sort-value="A146.000" | II 146
| data-sort-value="469.032" | III
| data-sort-value="1763-12-31" | 1763 or later
|  No. 14 March
| F maj.
| Musical clock
|
| V/12
| by Bach, W. F. (BR A76 F 207)
| 
|-
| data-sort-value="A147.000" | II 147
| data-sort-value="469.033" | III
| data-sort-value="1763-12-31" | 1763 or later
|  No. 15 La Combattuta
| G maj.
| Musical clock
|
| V/12
| by Bach, W. F. (BR A77 F 207)
| 
|-
| data-sort-value="A148.000" | II 148
| data-sort-value="469.034" | III
| data-sort-value="1763-12-31" | 1763 or later
|  No. 16 Scherzo
| G min.
| Musical clock
|
| V/12
| by Bach, W. F. (BR A78 F 207)
| 
|-
| data-sort-value="A149.000" | II 149
| data-sort-value="469.035" | III
| data-sort-value="1763-12-31" | 1763 or later
|  No. 17 Minuet
| G maj.
| Musical clock
|
| V/12
| by Bach, W. F. (BR A79 F 207)
| 
|-
| data-sort-value="A150.000" | II 150
| data-sort-value="469.036" | III
| data-sort-value="1763-12-31" | 1763 or later
|  No. 18 Trio
| G min.
| Musical clock
|
| V/12
| by Bach, W. F. (BR A80 F 207)
| 
|-
| data-sort-value="A177.000" | III 177
| data-sort-value="469.037" | III
| 
| Prelude and Fugue
| E♭ maj.
| Keyboard
| data-sort-value="000.36: 088" | 36: 88
| V/12: 134
| by Bach, J. Christoph?
| 
|-
| data-sort-value="A179.000" | III 179	
| data-sort-value="469.038" | III
| 1728 (JDH)
| 
| A min.
| Keyboard
|
| V/12
| by Heinichen
| 
|-
| data-sort-value="A180.000" | III 180	
| data-sort-value="469.039" | III
|
| Fugue
| D min.
| Keyboard
| data-sort-value="000.36: 188" | 36: 188
| V/12
| by Kellner, J. P.
| 
|-
| data-sort-value="A181.000" | III 181		
| data-sort-value="469.040" | III
|
| 
| A min.
| Keyboard
|
| V/12
| by Krebs, J. L.  (Krebs‑WV 825/2)
| 
|-
| data-sort-value="A182.000" | III 182			
| data-sort-value="469.041" | III
|
| Passacaglia
| D min.
| Keyboard
| data-sort-value="000.42: 234" | 42: 234
| V/12
| by Witt
| 
|- style="background: #F5F6CE;" 
| data-sort-value="A183.000" | III 183				
| data-sort-value="469.042" | III
| data-sort-value="1725-07-01" | 1725 (AMB)
| data-sort-value="Notebook A. M. Bach (1725) No. 06 Rondeau" | Notebook A. M. Bach (1725) No. 6 Rondeau
| B♭ maj.
| Keyboard
| data-sort-value="000.43 2: 027" | 432: 27
| data-sort-value="V/04: 085" | V/4: 85
| by Couperin (6ième Ordre: Les Bergeries)
| 
|-
| data-sort-value="1036.000" | 1036	
| data-sort-value="469.043" | III
| data-sort-value="1731-07-01" | 1731 (CPE)
| Trio
| D min.
|  data-sort-value="Vl Hc (Vlx2 Bc)" | Vl Hc (2Vl Bc)
|
| data-sort-value="VI/05" | VI/5
| by Bach, C. P. E. (H 569; Wq 145)
| 
|-
| data-sort-value="1037.000" | 1037		
| data-sort-value="469.044" | III
| data-sort-value="1745-01-01" |  (JGG)
| Sonata
| C maj.
| data-sort-value="Vlx2 Bc" | 2Vl Bc
| data-sort-value="000.09: 229" | 9: 229
| data-sort-value="VI/05" | VI/5
| by Goldberg
| 
|- style="background: #E3F6CE;"
| data-sort-value="A173.000" | III 173				
| data-sort-value="469.045" | III
| data-sort-value="1723-07-01" | 1712 (FAB) (JSB)
| Invention
| B min.
| Vl Kb
| data-sort-value="000.45 1: 172" | 451: 172
| data-sort-value="VI/05" | VI/5
| by Bonporti (Op. 10 No. 2)
| 
|- style="background: #E3F6CE;"
| data-sort-value="A174.000" | III 174				
| data-sort-value="469.046" | III
| data-sort-value="1723-07-01" | 1712 (FAB) (JSB)
| Invention
| B♭ maj. 
| Vl Kb
| data-sort-value="000.45 1: 176" | 451: 176
| data-sort-value="VI/05" | VI/5
| by Bonporti (Op. 10 No. 5)
| 
|- style="background: #E3F6CE;"
| data-sort-value="A175.000" | III 175			
| data-sort-value="469.047" | III
| data-sort-value="1723-07-01" | 1712 (FAB) (JSB)
| Invention
| C min.
| Vl Kb
| data-sort-value="000.45 1: 181" | 451: 181
| data-sort-value="VI/05" | VI/5
| by Bonporti (Op. 10 No. 6)
| 
|- style="background: #E3F6CE;"
| data-sort-value="A176.000" | III 176				
| data-sort-value="469.048" | III
| data-sort-value="1723-07-01" | 1712 (FAB) (JSB)
| Invention
| D maj.
| Vl Kb
| data-sort-value="000.45 1: 185" | 451: 185
| data-sort-value="VI/05" | VI/5
| by Bonporti (Op. 10 No. 7)
| 
|-
| data-sort-value="A184.000" | III 184				
| data-sort-value="469.049" | III
| data-sort-value="1747-07-01" |  (Zuc.)
| Sonata
| A min.
| Vl Bc
| 
| data-sort-value="VI/05" | VI/5
| by Zuccari ( No. 10)
| 
|-
| data-sort-value="A185.000" | III 185				
| data-sort-value="469.050" | III
|
| Sonata
| D maj.
| data-sort-value="Vlx2 Bc" | 2Vl Bc
| 
| data-sort-value="VI/05" | VI/5
| by Bach, C. P. E. (H 585; ≈H 507; Wq 74)
| 
|- id="BWV Anh. 186"
| data-sort-value="A186.000" | III 186
| data-sort-value="469.051" | III
|
| 
| F maj.
| data-sort-value="Vlx2 Bc" | 2Vl Bc
| 
| data-sort-value="VI/05" | VI/5
| by Bach, C. P. E. (H 576; Wq 154)
| 
|-
| data-sort-value="A187.000" | III 187
| data-sort-value="469.052" | III
|
| 
| F maj.
| Bas Fl Vne
| 
| data-sort-value="VI/05" | VI/5
| by Bach, C. P. E. (H 589)
| 
|-
| data-sort-value="A188.000" | III 188
| data-sort-value="469.053" | III
| data-sort-value="1740-07-01" |  (WFB)
| Sonata (Concerto)
| F maj.
| data-sort-value="Hcx2" | 2Hc
| data-sort-value="000.43 1: 047" | 431: 47
| V/12
| by Bach, W. F. (BR A12 F 10)
| 
|- style="background: #E3F6CE;"
| data-sort-value="A023.000" | I 23
| data-sort-value="469.054" | III
| data-sort-value="1710-07-01" | 1710 (Alb.)1710 (JSB)
| 
| E min.
| data-sort-value="Vlx2 Va Vc Vne" | 2Vl Va Vc Vne
| 
| data-sort-value="VI/05" | VI/5
| by Albinoni (Op. 2 No. 4 = 2nd Concerto)
| 
|- style="background: #E3F6CE;"
| data-sort-value="A189.000" | III 189
| data-sort-value="469.055" | III
| data-sort-value="1746-07-01" | 1745–1747 (JSB)
| 
| A min.
| data-sort-value="Hc Str Bc" | Hc Str Bc
| 
| data-sort-value="VI/05" | VI/5
| by Bach, C. P. E. (H 403; Wq 1)
| 
|- id="BWV Anhang New" style="background: #D8D8D8;"
| data-sort-value="A189.z99" | Anh. N
| data-sort-value="470.000" colspan="8" | New additions to the 
| data-sort-value="1500a" | Up ↑
|}

References

Sources
 
 
 
 
 
 
 
 
 
 
 
 
  Not a Bach-autograph: The manuscript Brussels, Royal Library, II 4093 (Fétis 2960) 
 
 
 
  Preface in English and German.
 
 
 
 
 
 
 
 
 
 
 
 
 
 
 
 
 
 
 

 
 
 Meiningen 1704: 
 
 
 
 
 
 
  Unaltered up unto its eighth printing in 1986.
 
 
 
 
 
 
 
 
 
 
 Volume I
 Volume II
 Volume III

External links
 
 BWV Anh. I, II and III at